= James Symington =

James Symington may refer to:

- James W. Symington (born 1927), U.S. Representative from Missouri (1969–1977)
- James H. Symington (1913–1987), religious leader of the Exclusive Brethren
- James Ayton Symington (1856–1939), English book and magazine illustrator
- James Symington, Canadian police officer, handler of 9/11 hero dog Trakr
