= Genelle =

Genelle is both a surname and a given name. Notable people with the name include:

- Richard Genelle (1961–2008), American entrepreneur and actor
- Genelle Guzman-McMillan (born 1972), American writer
- Genelle Williams (born 1984), Canadian actress
