= Hugh St. Leger =

Journalist and author of young adult fiction

- Born: c. 1857; Ipswich, Suffolk, England
- Died: 1925 (aged 67–68); Rochford, Essex, England
- Occupations: Journalist and author
- Years active: 1892–1901
- Known for: Juvenile adventure fiction

Hugh Anthony St. Leger (c. 1857 – Q4 1925) was an English journalist and author of juvenile fiction. He was the third youngest of eight children, but his two younger siblings both died in early childhood. His father died when he was four and St. Leger was elected to a place at the Clergy Orphan School as a result. He turned his experiences in the Merchant Navy and as a Hussar in a solid background for boy's adventure fiction.

== Early life ==
The England and Wales Christening Index shows him being baptised on 7 June 1857. He gave his age as 43 years and two months on 26 March 1900, which would give him a birth date in January 1857. (Note: It was not all that unusual at the time for baptism to take place after so many months, although the children of clergymen were usually baptised sooner than this.) He does not appear to be listed on the Index of Births. He was the sixth of eight children born to William Nassau St. Leger (1809 – 25 April 1861) and Mary Anne Penning York (c. 1842 – Q2 1889) William Nassau St. Leger had been born in Limerick, Ireland and was a Clergyman of the Church of England.

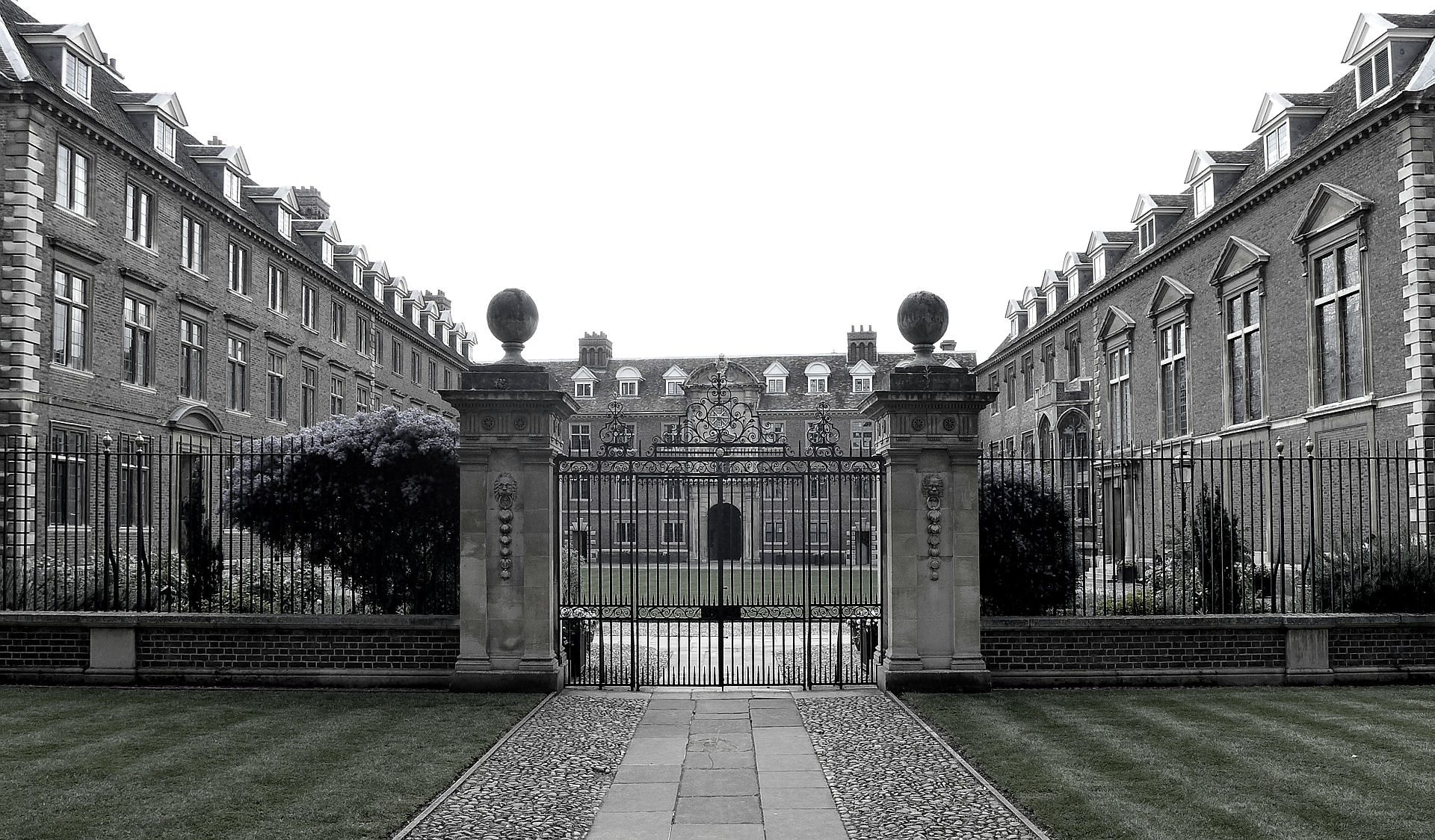
St. Catharine's College, Cambridge

His siblings were:

- Rupert (c. 1847 – 3 March 1916), who attended Queen Elizabeth's School in Ipswich as a Queen's Scholar. (Note: Nowadays, a Queen's Scholar at the school has half their fees remitted, but it might have been more valuable in the 1860s. Queen's Scholarships are awarded for academic excellence.) Rupert was also awarded an open scholarship at St. Catharine's College, Cambridge, worth some £40 plus a free room. He began his university career on 4 October 1865, was awarded his BA in 1869, ordained as a deacon in 1871, and as a priest in 1872. After 30 years as a curate, he was, in 1891, appointed Vicar to Ridgewell in Essex where he remained until his death. While a curate, he married Mary Jane Matthews (born c. 1885) a farmer's daughter, on 31 January 1880. The couple had 8 children, one of whom died before 1911. Rupert seems to have been a somewhat turbulent priest as he was summonsed for failing to pay the poor rate in May 1893. In August of 1893, his wife unsuccessfully prosecuted his curate for an indecent assault. (Note: It was a case of "he said, she said", and the male magistrates unsurprisingly opted for "he said". Mary Jane had to be restrained from physically assaulting the curate after he was acquitted after the five-hour hearing.) In November, 1893 Rupert was back in court again, this time as a defendant as he was summonsed for failing to send one of his seven surviving children to school.
- Marion (c. 1849 – ?) who worked as a governess, including for her brother Rupert. She became the third wife of Lear George Buckland Howe (c. 1844 – Q1 1914) in Stockwell on 4 July 1909.
- Warham (Note: His name is given an Markham in many records, but the more authoritative and clearly written records, such as the Cambridge Alumni Database or his Marriage Register, gives it as Warham.) (c. 1851 – Q3 1921) who attended the Clergy Orphan School at Canterbury and then Jesus College in Cambridge where he received his BA degree in 1876. He described himself initially as a journalist and later as a journalist and author in the census returns. The British Library shows him as having published several books, songs, and comic operas. He married Lisette Olivia Butler (c. 1849 – 1st quarter of 1919), the daughter of a deceased clergyman, in London on 18 September 1895.
- Arthur (c. 1853 – ?). The 1871 census found him in the Cavalry Barracks in Ipswich, having enlisted in the Royal Artillery. No further information on his career was found. Hubert followed him into the military several years later.

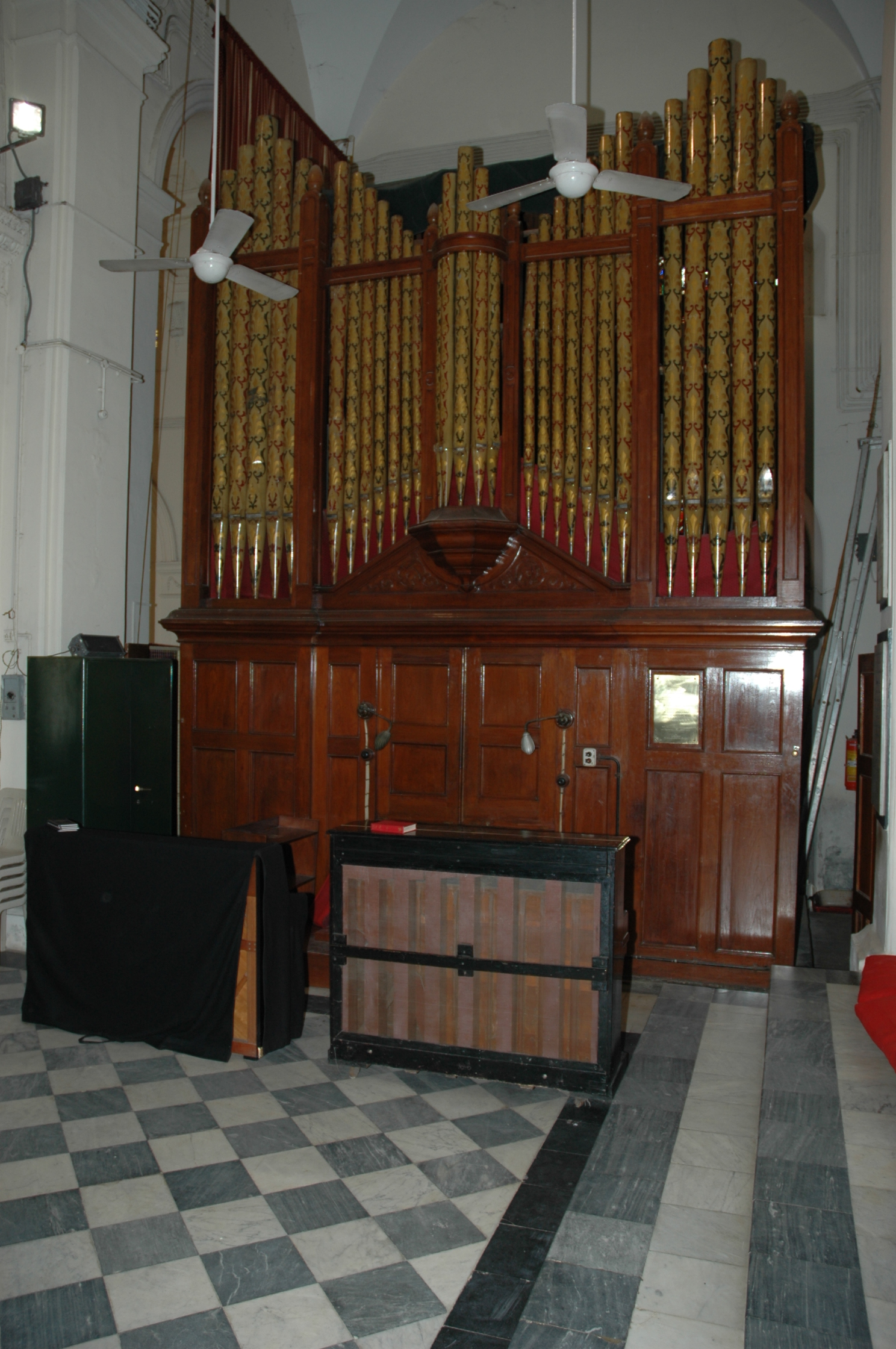
The Organ in St. George's Cathedral

- William Douglas (c. 1855 – 22 December 1921), attended Aspley School in Aspley Guise, and became the organist there after leaving school, giving lessons in the piano and organ. He emigrated to India where he married the seventeen-year old Emma Ethel Antoinette Stuart (c. 1863 – 10 March 1882) on 21 June 1880. They had one child in the following year. He was then the organist at St. George's Anglican Cathedral in Madras (now called Chennai). Emma and her daughter died within days of each other in 1882. William married Helen Louise Clerk (23 August 1857 – Q1 1949) on 15 May 1889, and the couple had four children. (Note: Douglas and Helen's children were: Douglas Francis born in Madras on 30 May 1890, a musician and teacher at the Royal Academy of Music.; Helen Evelyn born in Madras on 31 October 1891, who studied Drama.; Dennis Claude Grant born in Madras on 24 December 1892, who started his working life as a bank clerk.; Claudine Ethel born in Madras on 1 February 1894, who studied music and married Earle McKillock Nicholl of the Army Veterinary Service and died in Hindhead, Surrey on 5 May 1985.) William was an officer in the Madras Volunteer Guards and had reached the rank of Lt. Colonel when he retired in 1903. By 1913 he was the manager of The Madras Mail, and was still there in 1918. In 1920 he travelled to England where he died the following year.
- Ralph G (c. 1859 – Q3 1861) who died when he was two, in the same quarter as this younger sister.
- Anna (19 April 1861 – Q3 1961), who died as an infant. Her father died eight days after her birth.

=== Election to the Clergy Orphan School ===
In 1868 St. Leger followed in his brother Warham's footsteps and was elected to the Clergy Orphan School, aged c. 11. He was a pupil there during the 1871 census. The boys' school was then based in Canterbury. Students were elected to places in the school by the subscribers to the school. St. Leger had the fourth-highest number of votes for boys. The subscribers got a list of candidates a month before the election, and selected all those whose candidacy they favoured. (Note: Subscribers paid £1 1s. (one guinea) a year, or £10 10s (ten guineas) for a lifetime subscription.)

St. Leger and his siblings were not alone in becoming orphans. Farr's Life Table No. 3 show that in the period 1838 to 1864 a man who reached the age of 25, the age at which many young clergymen would have completed their academic training and been ordained, (Note: The minimum age for ordination in the Church of England as a Deacon was twenty-three, and as a Priest twenty-four.) had an roughly one in three chance of dying before he was 55. The odds were better than this as Clergymen suffered lower mortality than other professions. (Note: Clerical mortality was lower than any of the other 70 professions that Woods compared it with.) The risk of a clergyman of 25 dying was about one in four in 1861-1871. By contrast, the latest life table from the UK's Office of National Statistics, Life Table No. 17 based on data in 2010 – 2012 shows that the risk of man aged 25 dying before 55 is now less than one in twenty.

== Working life ==
Under the bye-laws of the Clergy Orphan Corporation, no boy could remain in the school past 15 years of age without the special leave of the committee. (Note: There were some exceptions for the academically gifted who were covered by endowed scholarships.) At that age, boys could be indentured as apprentices. The title of the charity specifically referred to "clothing, maintaining, and educating poor orphans of clergymen ...until of age to be put apprentice". A boy named Hugh Anthony St. Leger, of the right age became a Merchant Navy apprentice indentured to C. F. Ellis of London for four years from 23 November 1872. Unusually, no name of vessel is given.

== Military service ==
During the Second Anglo-Boer War, St. Leger enlisted in the Imperial Yeomanry on a short service, one year, enlistment in Ipswich on 26 March 1900, giving his age as 43 years and 2 months. He declared that he had previously served in the 19th Hussars, 2nd Dragoons, and had completed his agreed term of service. (Note: He probably served a minimum of eight years with the colours and four years in the reserve, as that was the norm after 1874.) (Note: The 19th Hussars fought in the Battle of Tel el-Kebir in September 1882 during the Anglo-Egyptian War. This battle features in two of St. Legers's stories.) He was discharged at his own request eight days later on 2 April 1900. (Note: It is not known why he resigned. In terms of what was happening in the Boer War, the British were already beginning to get the upper hand, Cronjé was forced to surrender with 4,000 men on 27 February 1900 and Ladysmith was relieved on 28 February. The only significant incident between St. Leger's enlistment and resignation was the engagement at Sanna's Post on 31 March 1900, where the British were defeated with a loss of 155 dead or wounded and 428 prisoners. However, news of this defeat only reached the newspapers in the UK the day after St. Leger resigned.) St. Ledger served in the Merchant Navy, but he may also have served in the Royal Navy, as he told the bankruptcy court in 1903 that he had served in both the Army and the Navy.

== Marriages and children ==
St. Leger married Catherine Ledger (1856–1912) In St. George's Church in Hanover Square in the third quarter of 1889. The couple had three children, all daughters:

- Kathrine Winifred (13 January 1891 – 20 April 1982)
- Phillis Mary Eigen (28 January 1892 – 22 September 1986)
- Margaret Evelyn (16 April 1893 – 9 January 1979)

St. Leger described himself as a publisher of books in the 1891 census. He then kept a coachman, whose wife acted as cook, along with a nurse, (Note: The nurse was for three-month old Kathrine Winifred, presumably. This number of servants put the family in the upper middle-class. At no other census were the St. Legers apparently so well off.) and a house-maid. By the 1901 census, he and his wife was visiting Mary A. Baldwin in Colchester. All three girls were away in a school run by Bertha and May Stevenson at 63 Hamilton Road in Reading. His profession was not described as author.

St. Leger petitioned for bankruptcy on 16 May 1903. He was scheduled for a public examined in Colchester Bankruptcy Court at 2pm on 26 June 1903. During his examination he blamed money lenders, whom he said had charged him 300% interest, for his failure. He was declared bankrupt, with effect from 19 June 1903. His trustee, the public received, was released from the trust on 23 November 1903 (Note: This meant that the Official Receiver had distributed all of St. Leger's available assets to his creditors.)

For the 1911 census, Catherine was living at 3 Rupert Road, Bedford Park, London while St. Leger was in Ipswich, Boarding with Henrietta Frazer Williamson, a widow who had two sons, only one of whom was still living. He gave his occupation as Author. Catherine died on 12 December 1912. St. Leger then married his former landlady, Henrietta Frazer Williamson, at All Angels Church in Bedford Park. (Note: The marriage index gives the marriage as occurring in the third quarter of 1913. However, Hugh has sworn out his application for a licence on 19 August 1913. Typically, marriages followed within a few days of the licence.)

Hugh died in the fourth quarter of 1925. Henrietta survived him by more than 20 years.

== Works ==
In 1893, The North Queensland Register republished a nautical short-story by St. Leger that had already run in Black and White. It is not clear how much St. Leger was contributing to magazines, or where.

=== List of longer fiction by St. Leger ===
What is remarkable about St. Leger, is that all of his longer fiction was produced in quite a short period, with seven books from 1894 to 1901.

The list of works below is drawn from searches on Jisc Library Hub Discover. (Note: The Jisc catalogue, collates 165 national, university, and research libraries in the UK and Ireland.)

Longer fiction by Hugh St. Leger
No.	Year	Title	Illustrator	Publisher	Pages	Notes
1	1894	Sou'Wester and Sword: a story, etc	Hal Hurst	Blackie & Son, London	320 p., 6 ill., 8º	(Note: A story first of the sea; featuring shark-fishing, mast-heading, mutiny, tropical storms, death, and shipwreck, and then of land; including struggles with a jaguar. The whole is topped off topped off by the seamen joining in the English expedition against the Madhi and the battle of El Teb. St. Leger had probably participated in this campaign. Reviewers said: "...one continuous adventure" – Table Talk (magazine); "...will delight the heart of any boy old enough to know a little about geography" – Bristol Times; "...full of exciting adventures..." – Yorkshire Post; "...a rattling sea-story ...a graphic picture of the battle of El-Teb and Soudanese warfare." – Aberdeen Free Press)
2	1896	"Hallowe'en" Ahoy! or, Lost on the Crozet Islands, etc	Herbert James Draper	Blackie & Son, London	320 p., 6 ill., 8º	(Note: Opens with a shipwreck on the South Coast of England from which only the captain and one seaman are rescued by the lifeboat in which the vicar's son is one of the crew. The vicar's son and the survivors ship together, with the captain acting as first mate. The friends are put in charge of a drifting derelict named Hallowe'en and discover a girl hidden aboard. They face storms and find the wreck of a Spanish galleon laden with treasure before finally arriving safely in England. Reviewers said: "The author...has made a considerable reputation as a story-teller. He seems to revel in maritime life, and returns to it in the present book...." – Western Morning News; "... a book that boys with a nautical turn of mind may revel in ...It is a pity that the author has not been able to deny himself the stereotyped discovery of treasure during the stay on the desolate island." – Morning Post; "...a bright and breezy story which does not strain the probabilities too much..." – Bristol Mercury (newspaper))
3	1897	An ocean outlaw: A story of adventure in the Good Ship "Margaret"	William Rainey	Blackie & Son, London	319 p., 6 ill., 8º	(Note: Available online at the British Library. Another sea story featuring a fire aboard ship, mutiny, piracy, hidden treasure, with an abundance of fighting throughout. Reviewers said: "...an ingenious and exciting sea story of mutiny, piracy, and hidden treasure ...Mr St. Leger knows how to catch and sustain the interest of young people." – Inverness Courier; "Blood and rum flow with equal freedom through the pages ...the sort of story that boys take to as ducks take to water..." – The Scotsman; "...St Leger, expert teller of sea stories..." – Western Daily Press)
4	1897	Skeleton reef; or, The adventures of Jack Rollock	Lancelot Speed	S. W. Partridge & Co, London	320 p., 16p. fs., 8º	(Note: Available on-line at the British Library. Starts in school where the hero had a fight with the school bully. The hero wants to follow his late father's profession and runs away from school to go to sea. He undergoes a series of trials and tribu8ilations, mainly due to his own disobedience. Unusually for juvenile fiction, the action is spread out over three years. Reviewers said: "...we expect a good many boys ...may read ...with agonising enjoyment." – Liverpool Mercury; "Mr St. Leger makes good use of colour, and he crowds incident on incident, each as fascinating as the other." – Dundee Advertiser; "... an exciting story for boys..." – Yorkshire Post; "...just the book boys will delight in..." – Sheffield Independent)
5	1897	The "Rover's" Quest: a story, etc	J. Ayton Symington	W. & R. Chambers, London	270 p., 6 ill., 8º	(Note: A boy goes adrift and is picked up a ship. He undergoes all the usual adventures, mutiny, shipwreck, and a spell on a desert island. He is then picked up by the Rover, which is searching for some castaways. Reviewers said: "The story is brightly written, and there is plenty of dash and colour in it, with a strong flavour of brine and breeze." – Dundee Advertiser; "A good sea tale, full of life and adventure...We have read no better sea story for a long time." – London Evening Standard; "...an exciting story..." – Glasgow Herald)
6	1899	Shipmates: A story of adventure in the Merchant Service	Percy F. Spence	Griffith, Farran, Browne & Co, London	384 p., ill., 8º	(Note: Tells the tale of two friends, apprentices in the merchant service who undergo a series of adventures. St. Leger was himself an apprentice in the Merchant Service, so could describe this world realistically. Reviewers said: "...a spirited tale of apprentice life in the merchant service..." – Dundee Advertiser; "The tale itself is in Mr. St. Leger's best style, and this will be sufficient recommendation to those who know anything about the works of the author..." – Liverpool Mercury; "It gives an excellent idea of what life afloat really is, and it will stimulate or check, according to the boy's disposition, the burning desire, which seizes upon most British lads at some time of their lives, to become a sailor." – Pall Mall Gazette; "...is among the beat of the season's tales of sea-life." – The Observer)
7	1901	Billets and Bullets. The adventures of a trooper, etc	Frank Feller	Griffith, Farran, Browne & Co, London	vii. 312 pages, 8º	(Note: A young man is alerted that his uncle is trying to force his sister into a marriage with a Pasha against her will. He rescues her, but has to abandon hope of a commission as he is dependent on his uncle. Instead he enlists and sees service in York, Ireland, and Egypt. St. Leger was himself a trooper in the 19th Hussars. Baker, in his Guide to Historical Fiction states that the book is A good account of the military operations at Tel-el-Kebir and Cairo. Reviews said: "...a rattling story of adventure and fighting in Egypt, which the Kassassin and Tel-el-Kebir chapters stand out as capital examples of literary treatment." – Pall Mall Gazette; "It is an admirable book, written in a spirited fashion, and simply delightful reading for young England." – Queen; "a very well written book ...numerous escapades and hair-breadth escapes form very good reading, and should appeal strongly to the younger generation" – Manchester Courier; "not out of date ...now appeal(s) to an entirely fresh generation of boys..." – Morning Post; "...a capital story for boys, describing with dash and verve the adventures in Ireland and Egypt of a young Hussar..." – Leeds Mercury)

Note, it is certain that this list is not complete as both the Bristol Times and the Western Morning News refer to Tales Told after "Lights out" as a previous boys' book by St. Leger However, no catalogue details could be found.

The Morning Post complained that Griffith and Farran had reissued three books in a uniform edition without any indication that they were reissues. The three books were:

- In the Queen's Navee C. N. Robinson and J. Leyland
- The Lion Cub by Fred Whishaw, the story of Peter the Great’s youth
- Billets and Bullets by St Ledger

However, only the first of this is clearly a reissue, (Note: In the Queen's navee: the adventures of a colonial cadet on his way to the 'Britannia' by Commander C.N. Robinson, R.N. and John Leyland and illustrated by Walter W. May, was first published in 1892 by Griffith Farran & Co. in London, and by Brentano's in New York.) based on the JISC catalogue data. Moreover, Baker gives 1901 as the year of publication for The Lion Cub. No record of an earlier publication of Billets and Bullets could be found on Jisc Library Hub Discover, on press reviews or advertisements, nor on second-hand book sites. Even so, it is still perfectly possible the St. Leger wrote the book in 1882 or 1883, and later republished it to take advantage of the military enthusiasm accompanying the Anglo-Boer War.

=== Sample illustrations ===
The following illustrations, made by William Rainey RI RBA ROI (21 July 1852 – 24 January 1936) for An Ocean Outlaw: a story of adventure in the good ship "Margaret" (London: Blackie & Son, 1896) give some idea of the frenetic pace of Huge St. Leger's books. Images by courtesy of the British Library (Note: The British Library catalogues St. Ledger's work under the name "Saint Leger", rather than the more common short form.)

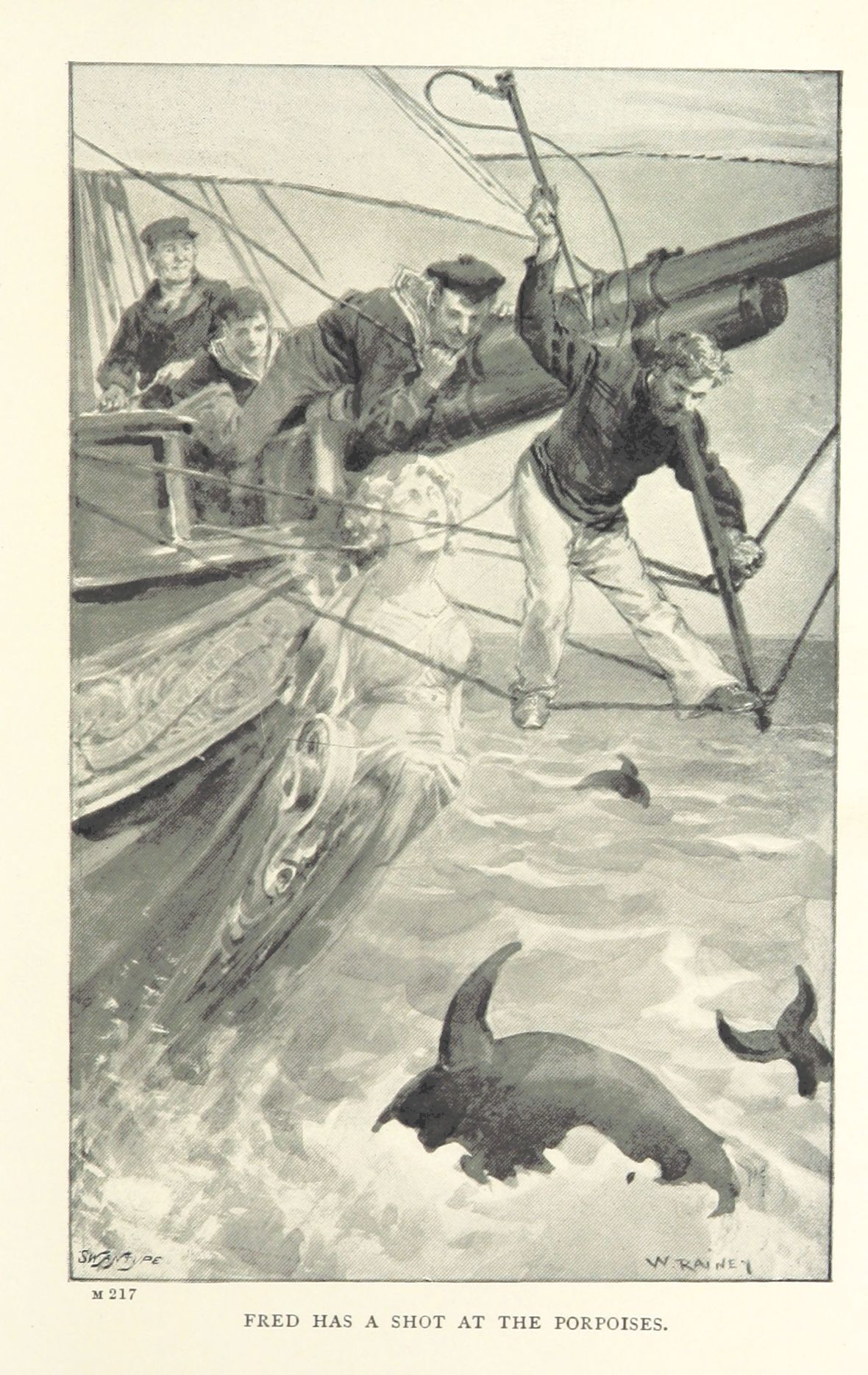
Page-037

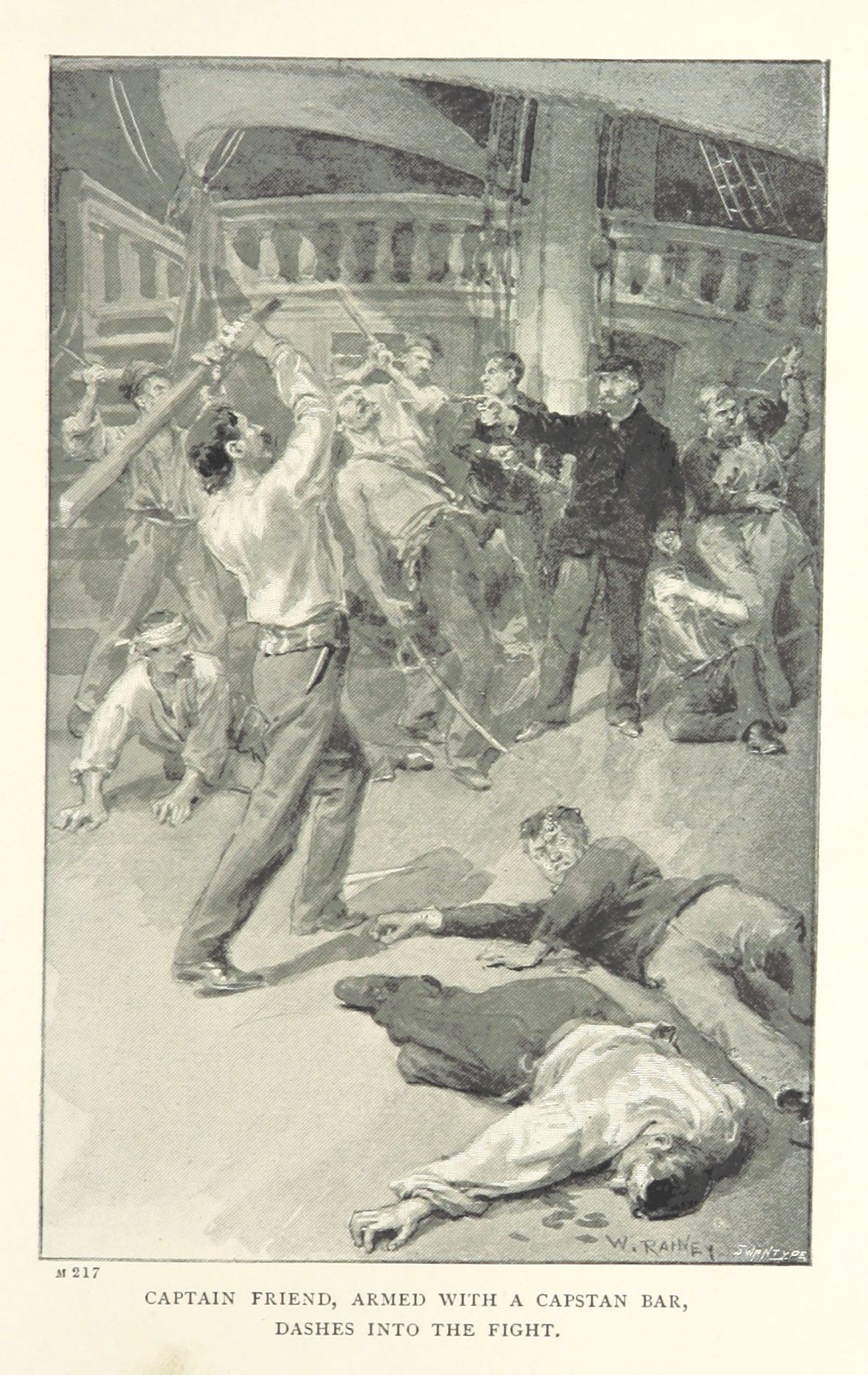
Page-111

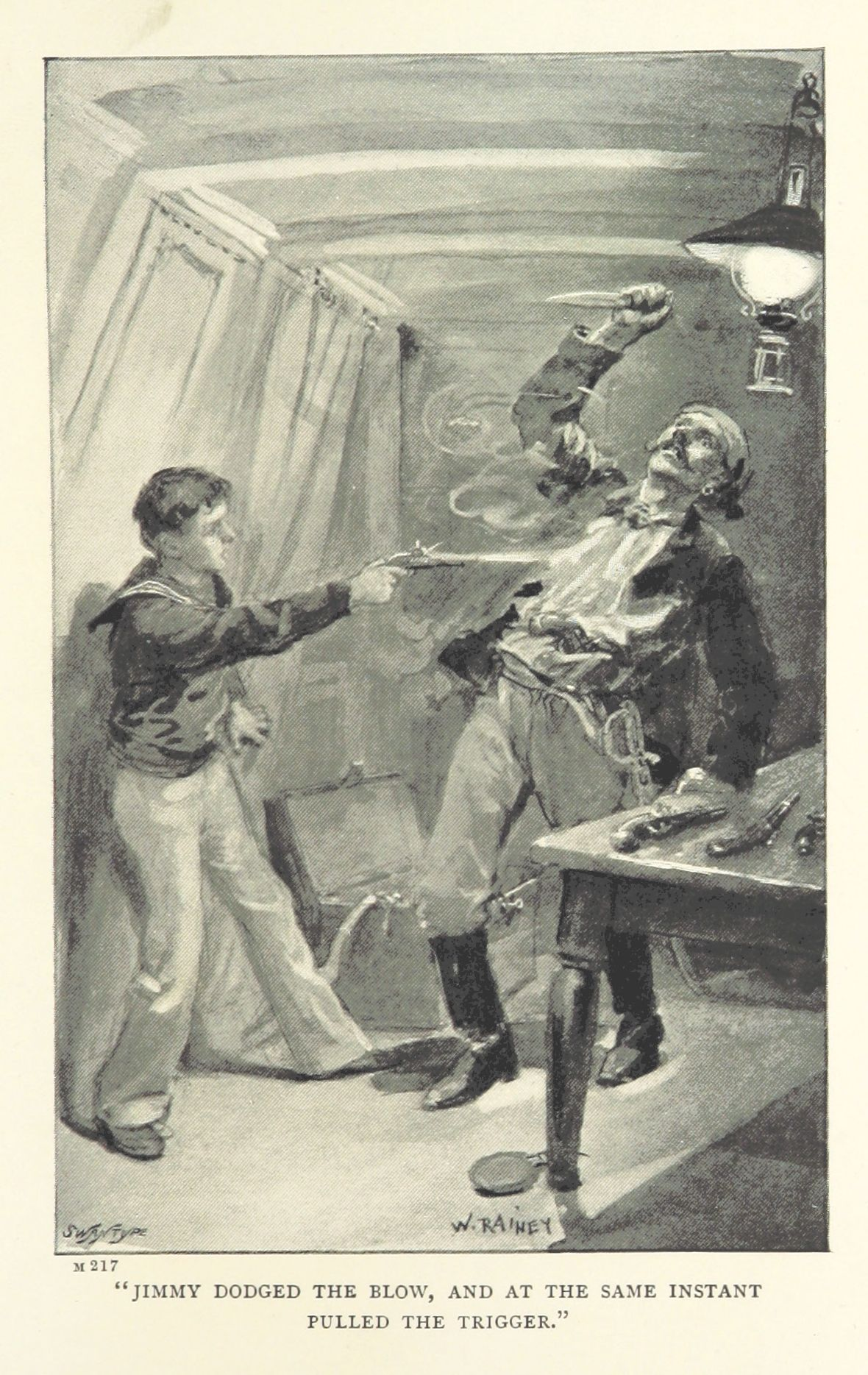
Page-166

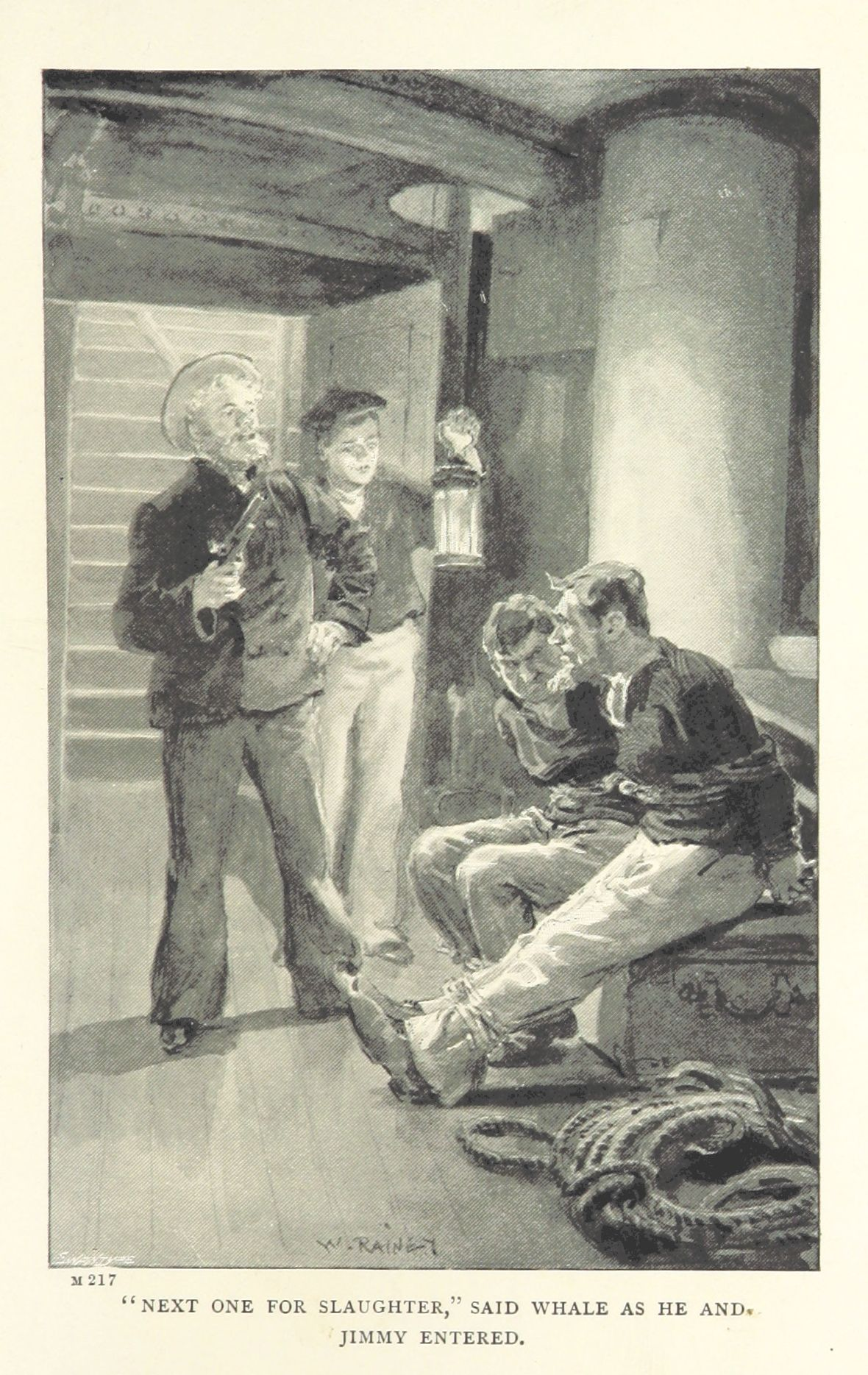
Page-208

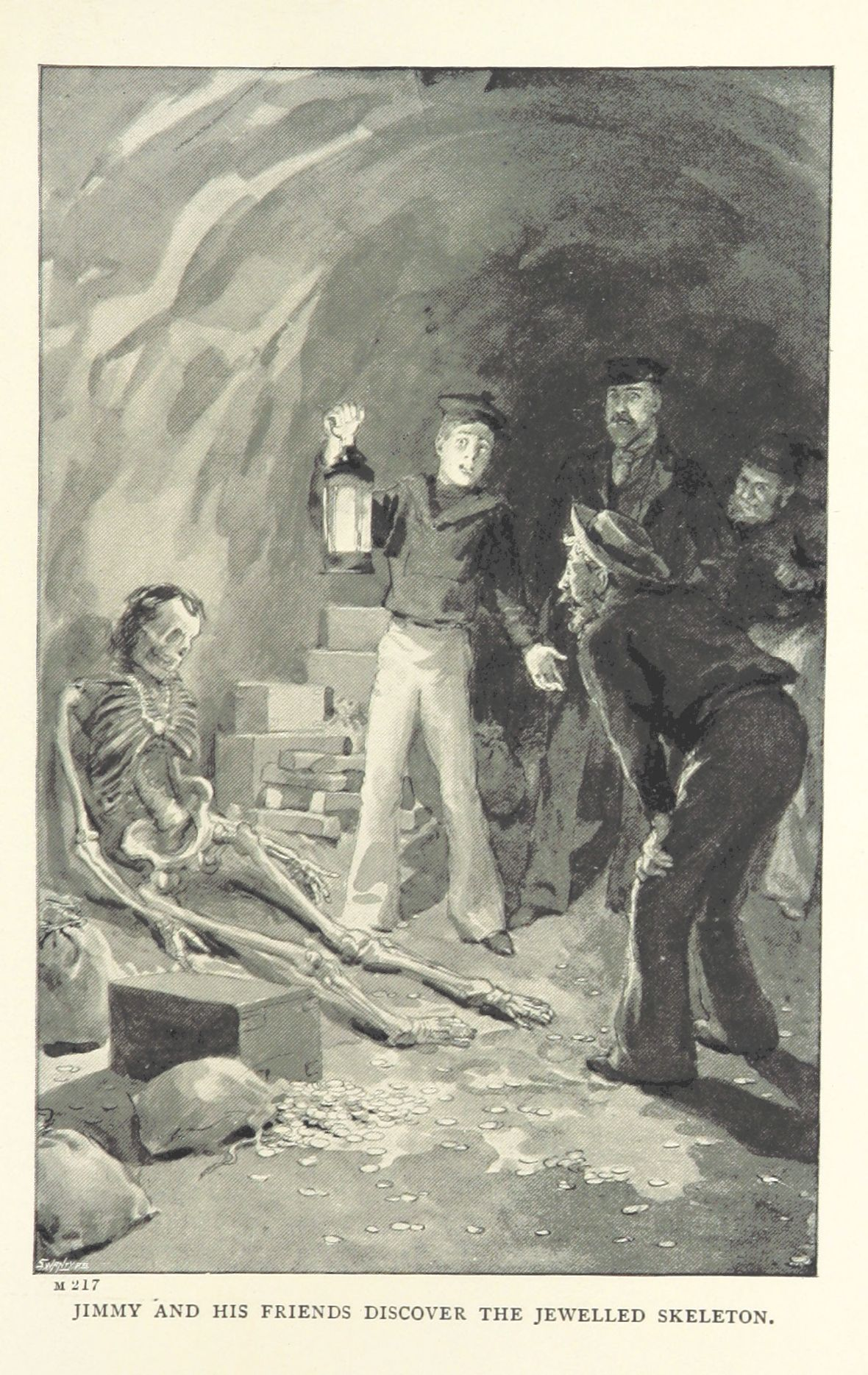
Page-252

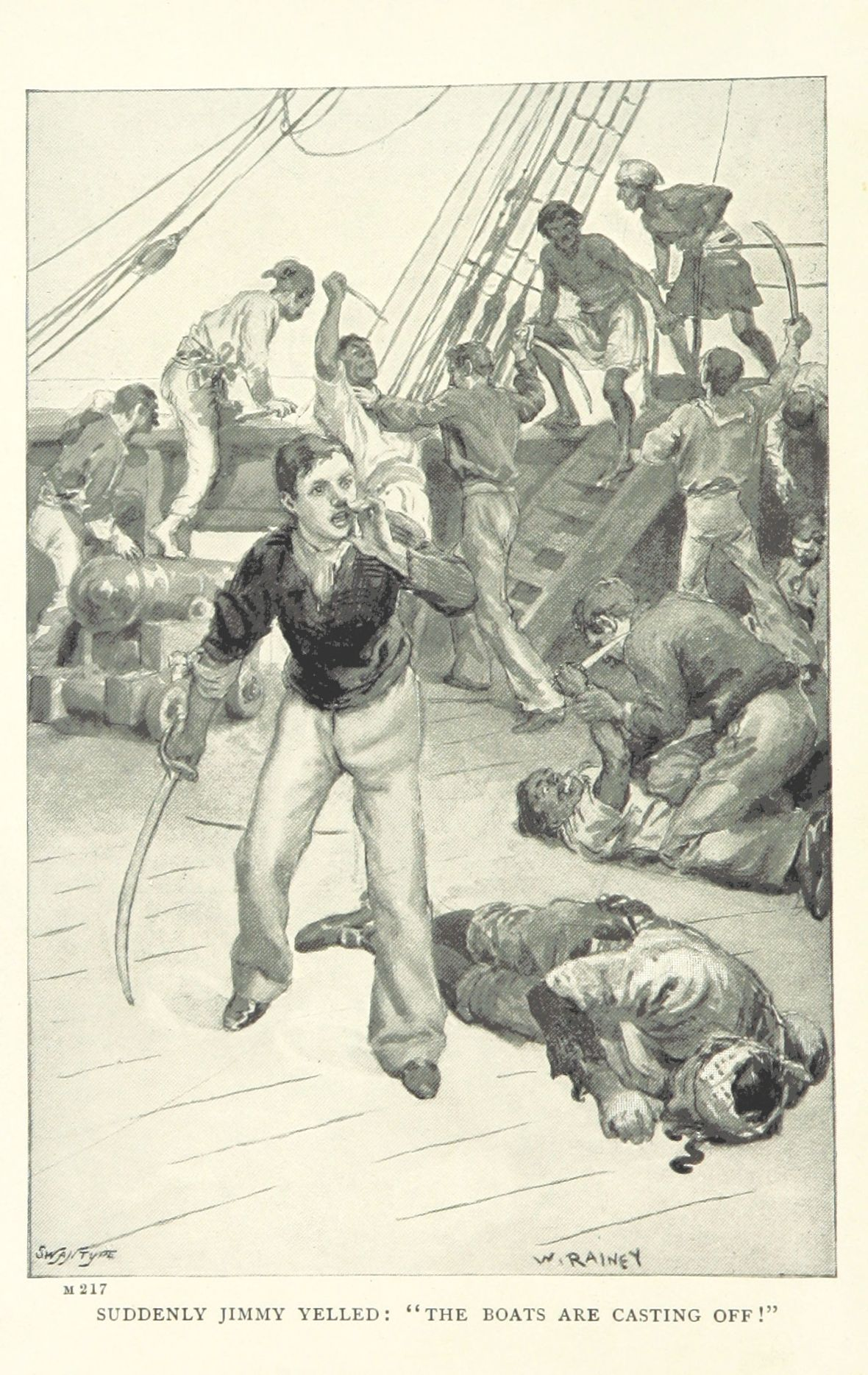
Page-288
