= Genelle Guzman-McMillan =

American writer and 9/11 survivor (born 1971)

- Born: 1971 (age 54–55)
- Known for: 9/11 survivor
- Notable work: Angel in the Rubble

Genelle Guzman-McMillan is a Trinidadian-American writer known for being the last person rescued from the rubble of the World Trade Center after the September 11 attacks in 2001, having spent 27 hours trapped under debris. While trapped in total darkness and pain, she claims she felt a strong hand hold hers and heard a reassuring voice say his name was "Paul", telling her that she would survive. A German Shepherd dog named Trakr found her. Her survival story has been widely covered in media, and she has written a memoir detailing her experience titled Angel in the Rubble. She is the subject of the Lifetime movie Angel in the Rubble: The Genelle Guzman Story, and is portrayed by Sherri Shepherd.

== See also ==
- Will Jimeno
- John McLoughlin (police officer)
