= Trakr =

Police dog who found the last survivor of the 9/11 attacks

- Species: Canis familiaris
- Breed: German Shepherd
- Sex: Male
- Born: c. 1994; Prague
- Died: April 2009
- Nationality: Czech Republic
- Occupation: Police dog and Search and rescue dog
- Employer: Halifax Regional Police
- Years active: 1995 – 2001
- Known for: September 11 attacks
- Owner: James Symington

Trakr (c. 1994 – April 2009) was a German Shepherd police dog who along with his handler, Canadian police officer James Symington, discovered the last survivor of the September 11 attacks at the World Trade Center in New York City in 2001. For his accomplishments, Trakr was named one of history's most heroic animals by Time magazine. In 2008, Symington won an essay contest sponsored by BioArts International to find the world's most "cloneworthy dog," as a result of which Trakr was cloned, producing five puppies.

== Background ==
Symington was one of the founders of the canine unit for the Halifax Regional Police, where he served for thirteen years. His police dog, Trakr, was from the Czech Republic and joined the Halifax Regional Police in 1995 at age of fourteen months. Trakr worked for the department for six years, finding over $1 million in contraband, as well as finding missing people and helping in arresting hundreds of criminals. He was prematurely retired from the force in May 2001 as retribution against Symington for preventing senior officials in his department from enacting a policy to euthanize Trakr and all retiring K9s.

After Trakr's retirement, Symington took a leave from the force.

== 9/11 search and rescue ==
Symington and his dog saw the search and rescue operations in New York City on television on September 11, 2001 and drove with their friend, Corporal Joe Hall, for 15 hours from Prospect Bay, Nova Scotia to Manhattan to help out, arriving in the early hours of September 12. During the morning of September 12, Trakr got a "live hit" (signs of life) under the rubble. Firefighters dug in the spot, and found Genelle Guzman-McMillan, the last of the 20 survivors who had been inside the buildings when they collapsed, under 30 feet of unstable debris. Guzman, an assistant with the Port Authority of New York, had descended from the 64th floor of the South Tower of the World Trade Center and was on the 13th floor of the South Tower when it fell. She was trapped for approximately 26 hours before her rescue.

On September 14, Trakr collapsed from chemical and smoke inhalation, burns, and exhaustion, and was treated with intravenous fluids. After Trakr was released the next day, Symington, Hall, and Trakr returned home to Canada.

Officials from the Halifax police saw Symington on television, and suspended him with pay from the force for participating in rescue efforts in New York without permission and while on leave. He was later given the opportunity to return to work, but declined under the existing work conditions. In 2005, Dr. Jane Goodall honored Symington and Trakr with an "Extraordinary Service to Humanity Award" for their efforts.

== In the news ==
Trakr and his progeny have been profiled by media worldwide, including CNN, CBS Early Show, USA Today, Los Angeles Times, Dog World and many more. They were also featured as one of People magazine's top stories of 2009.

== Later years ==
After leaving the force, Symington and Trakr moved to the Los Angeles, California area, where Symington took up acting. Symington appeared, often under the name Peter James, in a number of television soap operas including Days of Our Lives, General Hospital, The L Word, and The Young and the Restless, as well as working as a stunt double, fight coordinator, and small part film actor.

In his later years, Trakr suffered from degenerative myelopathy, a neurological disease, and lost use of his hind legs. Some experts attributed the condition to inhaling smoke at the World Trade Center site. Symington took Trakr to Pawspice, a California end-of-life organization that serves as the equivalent of a hospice for pets and an animal oncology consultation service. Pawspice outfitted Trakr with a cart so that he could power himself with his front legs.

Trakr died in April 2009.

== Cloning ==
Shortly before Trakr's death, Symington entered "Best Friends Again" (also called the Golden Clone Giveaway), an essay contest sponsored by BioArts International, one of the world's largest biotech companies offering pet cloning, to find the world's most "clone-worthy" dog. Symington's essay was chosen out of a field of 200 others, impressing the company CEO with the story of Trakr's police dog abilities and the World Trade Center rescue.

BioArts sent samples of Trakr's DNA to South Korean veterinarian Hwang Woo-Suk and his laboratory, Sooam Biotech Research Foundation, which had performed the first-ever dog cloning in 2005. The cloning, performed in Yongin, Korea, involved inserting the DNA into five "surrogate" egg cells, each of which was implanted into a different female dog. In June 2009, five clone puppies, Trustt, Solace, Valor, Prodigy, and Deja Vu, were all delivered to Symington. At the time, BioArts was selling cloning services privately for $144,000 per puppy.

Some animal welfare groups, including the American Society for the Prevention of Cruelty to Animals, criticized or questioned the cloning effort over concerns that cloned animals may suffer health problems.

As of January 2011, the clones were being trained by Symington as search and rescue dogs.

== See also ==
- List of individual dogs
