= James Ayton Symington =

English illustrator (c.1856–1939)

- Born: c. 1856; Leeds, England
- Died: 6 February 1939 (aged 82–83); Epsom, Surrey, England
- Other name: J A S
- Occupation: Illustrator
- Years active: 1886–1914 (Note: Houfe suggests that he was active in 1890–1908, but he had already illustrated one book by 1886, and continued to do so until 1914.)
- Known for: Illustrating adventure stories
- Notable work: The illustrations for the 1905 Dent re-issue of Robinson Crusoe

James Ayton Symington (c. 1856 – 2 February 1939) was an English book and magazine illustrator from Leeds. He worked closely with the Leeds publisher Richard Jackson, but moved to London after his marriage in 1889.

== Early life ==
Very little is known about his early life. Kirkpatrick notes that he did not appear in the census records until 1891, when he was 34 years old, and there is no record of his birth in the Civil Registration Birth Index. The first public notice of Symington appears to be in the Leeds Mercury in April 1886, which announced that The Rivers of Yorkshire by George Radford would be published in October by Richard Jackson and would have 12 etchings by Symington, a Yorkshire etcher of rising popularity.The book was published by subscription, with ordinary subscribers paying 10s. 6d. (half a guinea), 200 copies on Japan paper at a guinea (£1 1s.). and 25 proofs on satin at two guineas (£2 2s.). The book was eventually published on 8 December 1886 with the revised title Rambles by Yorkshire Rivers. (Note: The British Library give the book a provisional publication date of 1880, as the book is not dated. However the press coverage and advertisements make clear that it was published in December 1886. Note that the 12 etchings in the British Library edition are not full page, but have large margins around them.)

Symington illustrated a number of other books for Richard Jackson including Yorkshire by the Sea, another published by subscription volume by George Radford, Jackson's New Illustrated Guide to Leeds and Environs (1889), and Some Historic Mansions of Yorkshire and their Associations (1888), (Note: This had 25 etchings in total, and Symington shared the work with Anthony Buckle and Stanley Medway, who had illustrated earlier books for Richard Jackson.) by civil engineer and amateur antiquarian William Wheater (19 October 1840 – 30 December 1911)

== Marriage and middle life ==
The 1891 census (5 April 1891) shows Symington with a wife Kate (18 January 1859 – 18 November 1944). Kirkpatrick speculates that this was Catherine Tindall who married a James Symington at the Parish Church in Doncaster on 19 May 1889. There are a number of facts that suggest that this is not correct:

- In the 1911 Census (2 April 1911), Kate give the number of years married as 29, suggesting that their marriage took place between 3 April 1881 and 2 April 1882. Of course, errors in ages and durations in the census returns are not uncommon.
- Secondly, the bridegroom gave his name as James Symington, rather than as James Ayton Symington, at a time when it was the normal practice to give one's full names for such formal occasions.
- Thirdly, the James Symington that married Catherine Tindall in Doncaster on 19 May 1889 gave his occupation as a labourer, the son of John Symington, a painter. Catherine Tindall was the daughter of the late Henry Tindal, also a labourer. The couple were living together at 27 March Gate in Doncaster at the time of their marriage.
- Fourthly, both bride and groom gave their ages as 26, which would have given them birth dates between 20 May 1862 and 19 May 1863, whereas Kate Symington was born on 18 January 1859, and Symington was born c.1856.

In any case, Symington and Kate had one son, Arthur Ayton (30 Jan 1898 – 3rd quarter of 1955) who trained as a civil engineer and was his mother's executor.

The 1891 census found Symington and his wife living at 71 Cheverton Road, Putney, Wandsworth, London. They were still there in 1896, but 1901 found them living with their young son at 1 West Park Gardens, Kew Gardens, Kew, London. They were still at that address in 1912. Symington was granted permission to erect a house at Old Church Lane, Stanmore, Edgeware, North London in October 1912. He seems to have built the house as, in 1916, the next-of-kin address on his sons enlistment papers gave his address as "Loidis" Old Church Road, Greater Stanmore.

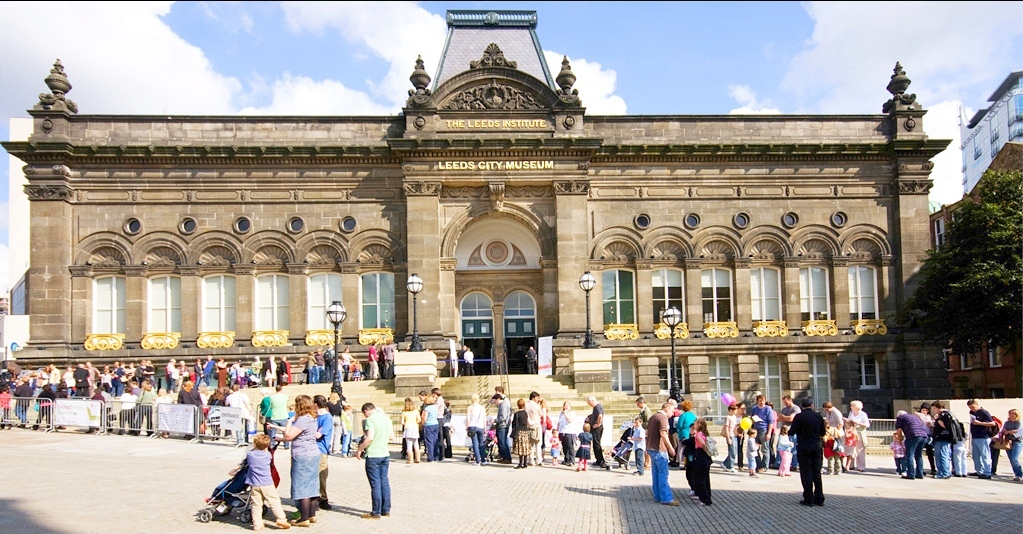
Leeds-city-museum

They were still in Church Lane in 1922, but had moved to Dale Cottage, Meadowside, Great Bookham, Surrey by 1927. and were still there ten years later. Although living in London, Symington maintained his connection with Leeds. His son was born in Leeds, and in 1934 Symington donated 7 black-and-white drawings of Yorkshire windmills to the Leeds Museum.

== Work ==
Symington illustrated both magazines and books. He seems to have done almost no illustration from his late fifties, after the start of the First World War.

=== Magazine illustration ===
Symington was a regular contributor to:

- The Illustrated Sporting and Dramatic News
- Good Words
- The Windsor Magazine
- The Universal Review
- Atalanta
- The Art Journal
- Young England (Note: Published by the Sunday School Union.)
- Silver Link (Note: Another magazine published by the Sunday School Union.)

Symington also contributed illustrations to story papers, including

- Chums where he was a regular contribution for a time.
- Young Folk's Tales
- Cheer, Boys, Cheer
- The Boy's Own Paper (Note: He contributed to one issues in 1921, the only example of his work after the First World War,)

Thorpe notes that Symington was one of two regular contributor to the Sporting and Dramatic News who dealt especially with country subjects. Symington often featured in the annual sales of the original art for the Illustrated Sporting and Dramatic News.

==== Example of magazine illustration ====
Illustrations by James Ayton Symington for "The Progress of Lawn Tennis" by Wilfred Baddeley in The Windsor Magazine. Volume 2: July to December, 1895, pp 179–184.Symington illustrated a further three articles in that volume of the magazine.

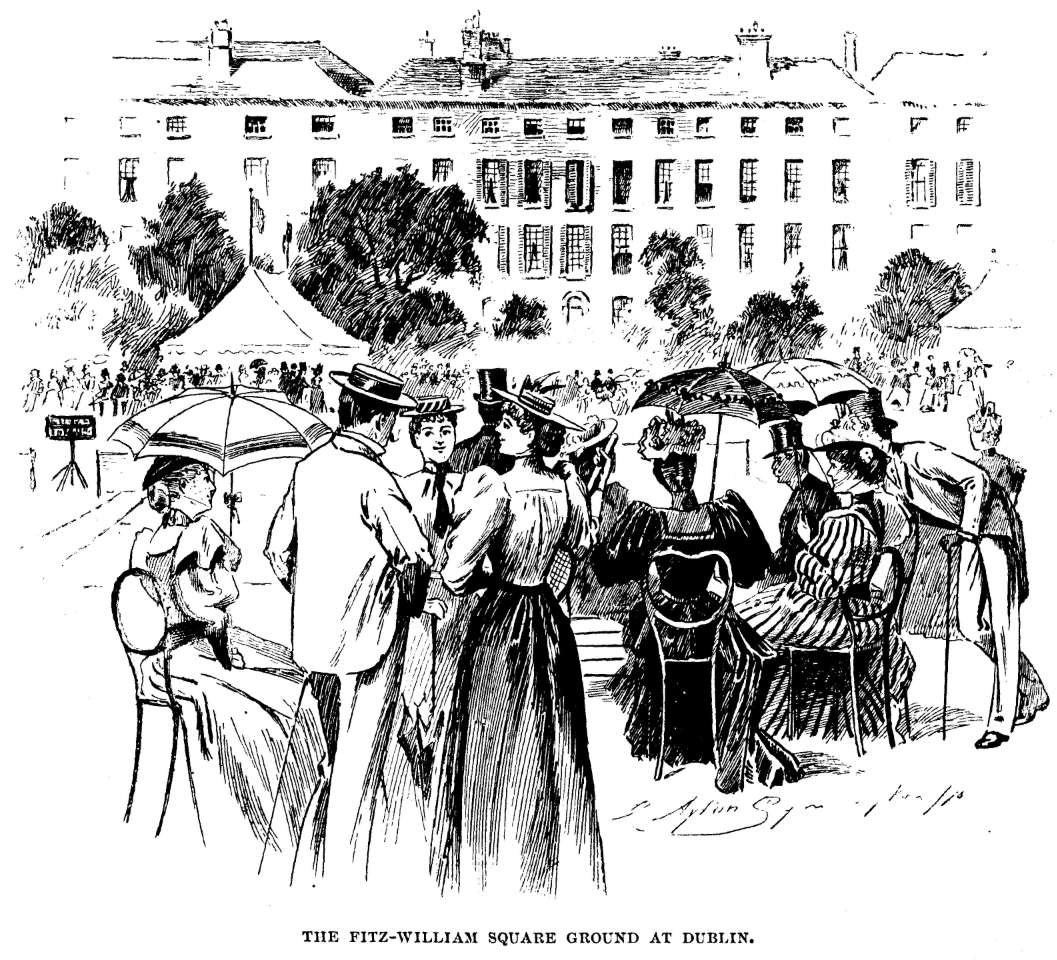
Tennis in Dublin

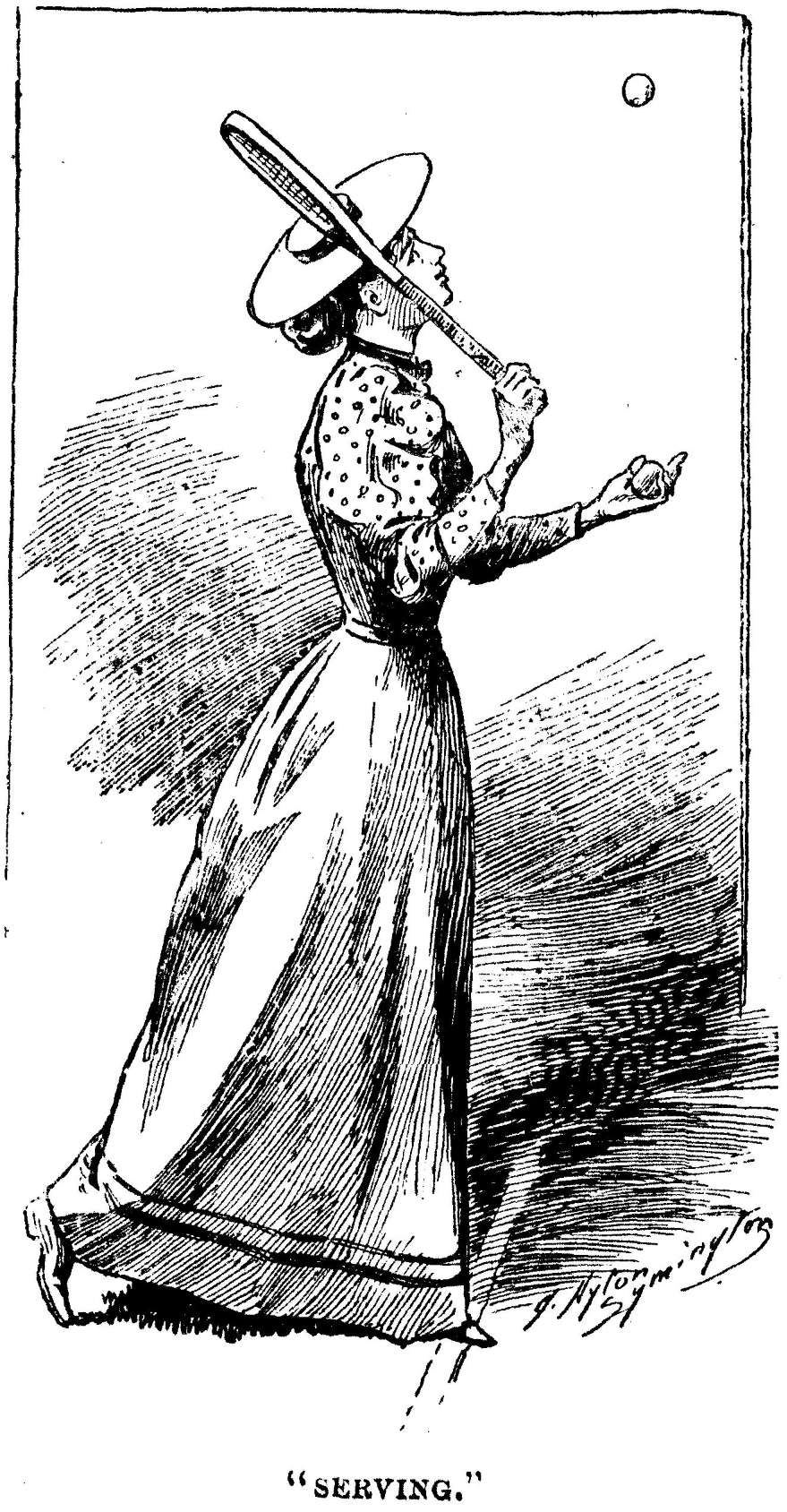
Serving

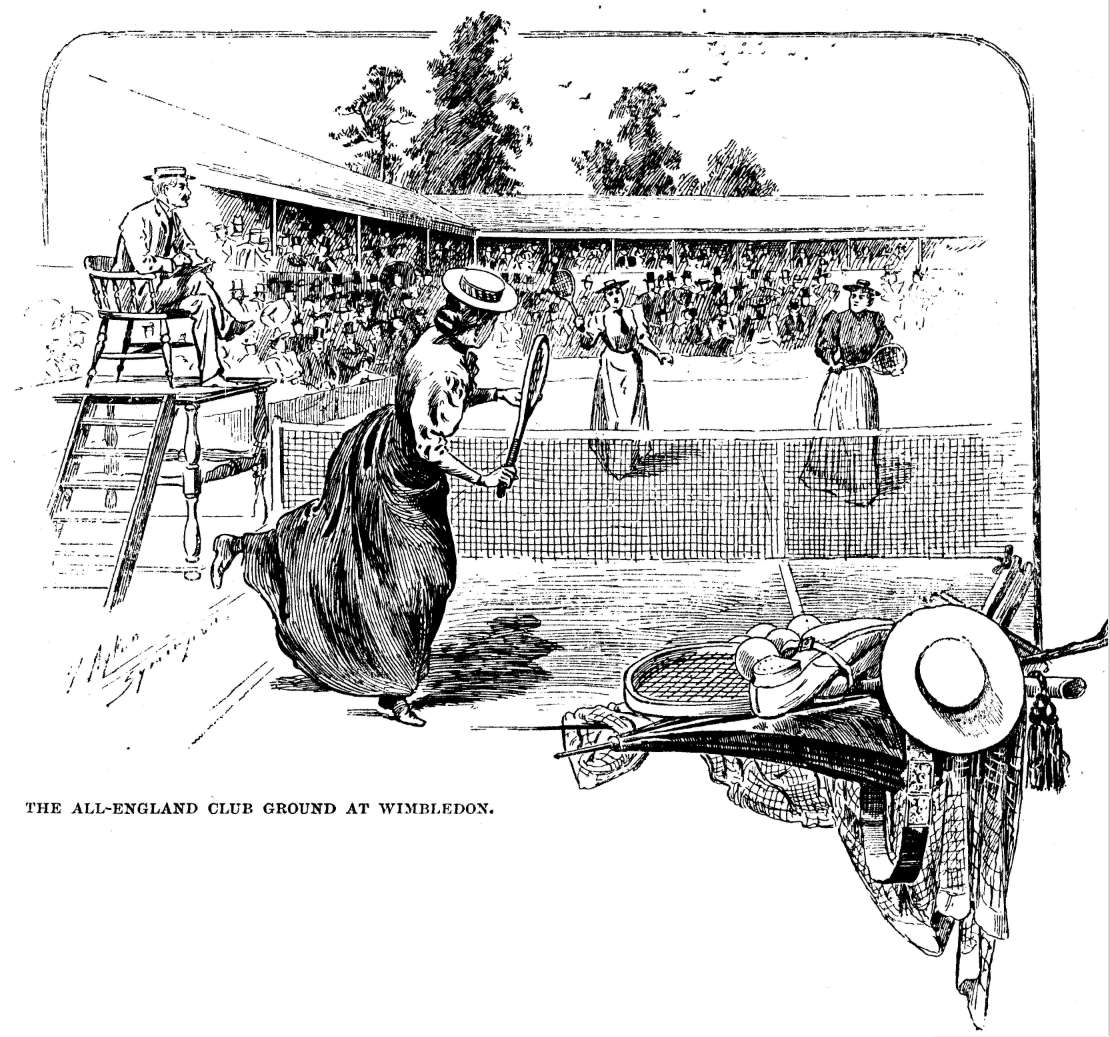
Tennis at Wimbledon

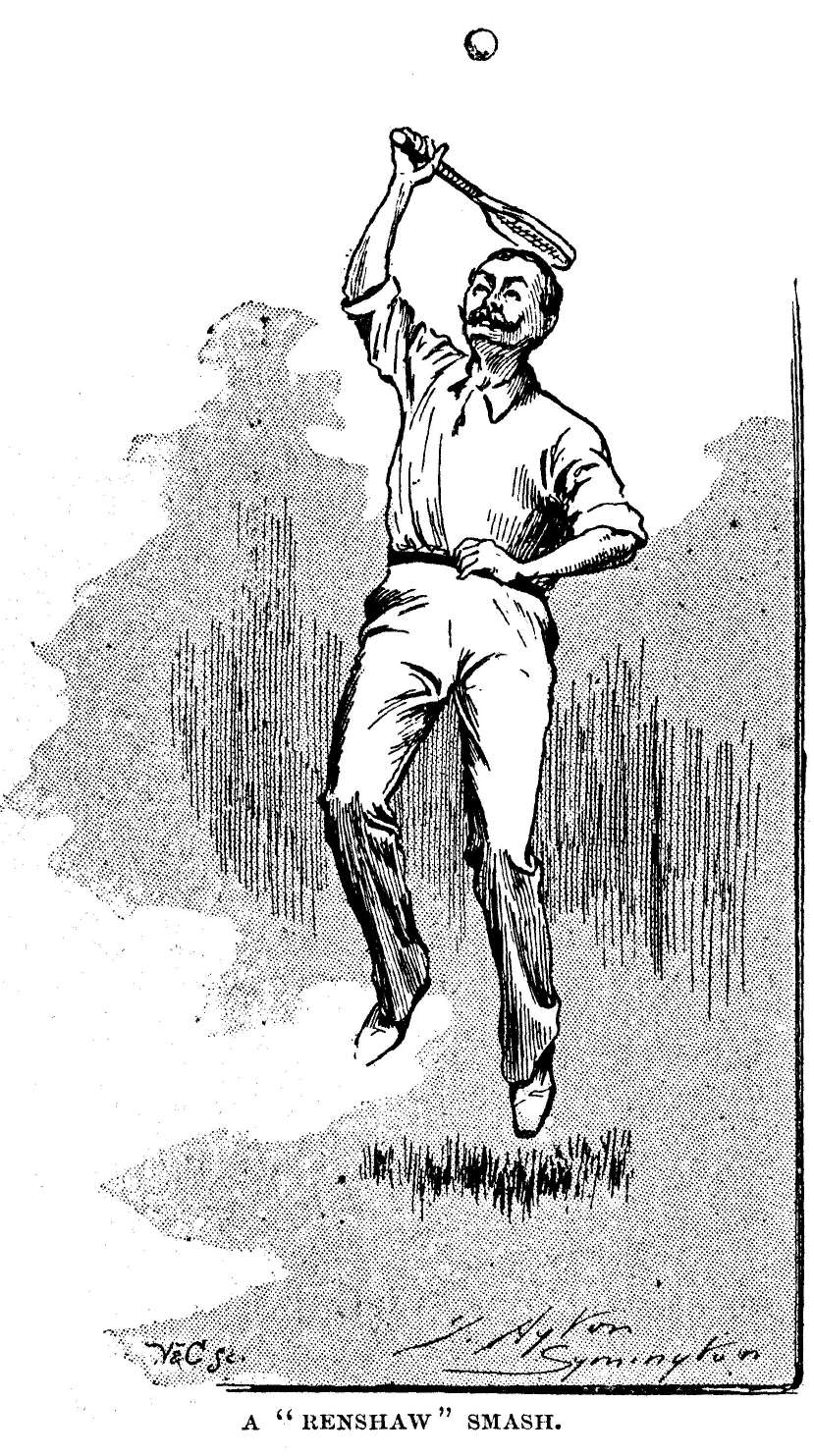
Smash

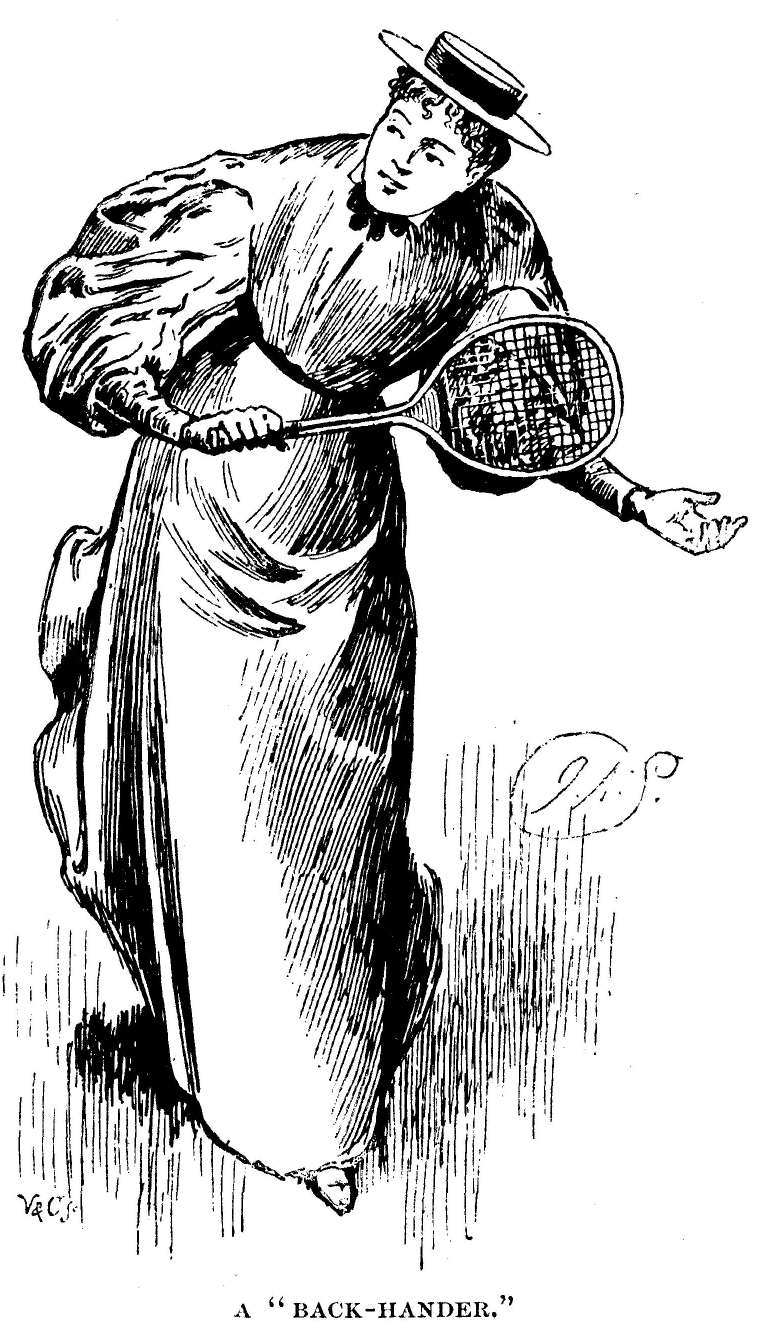
Backhand

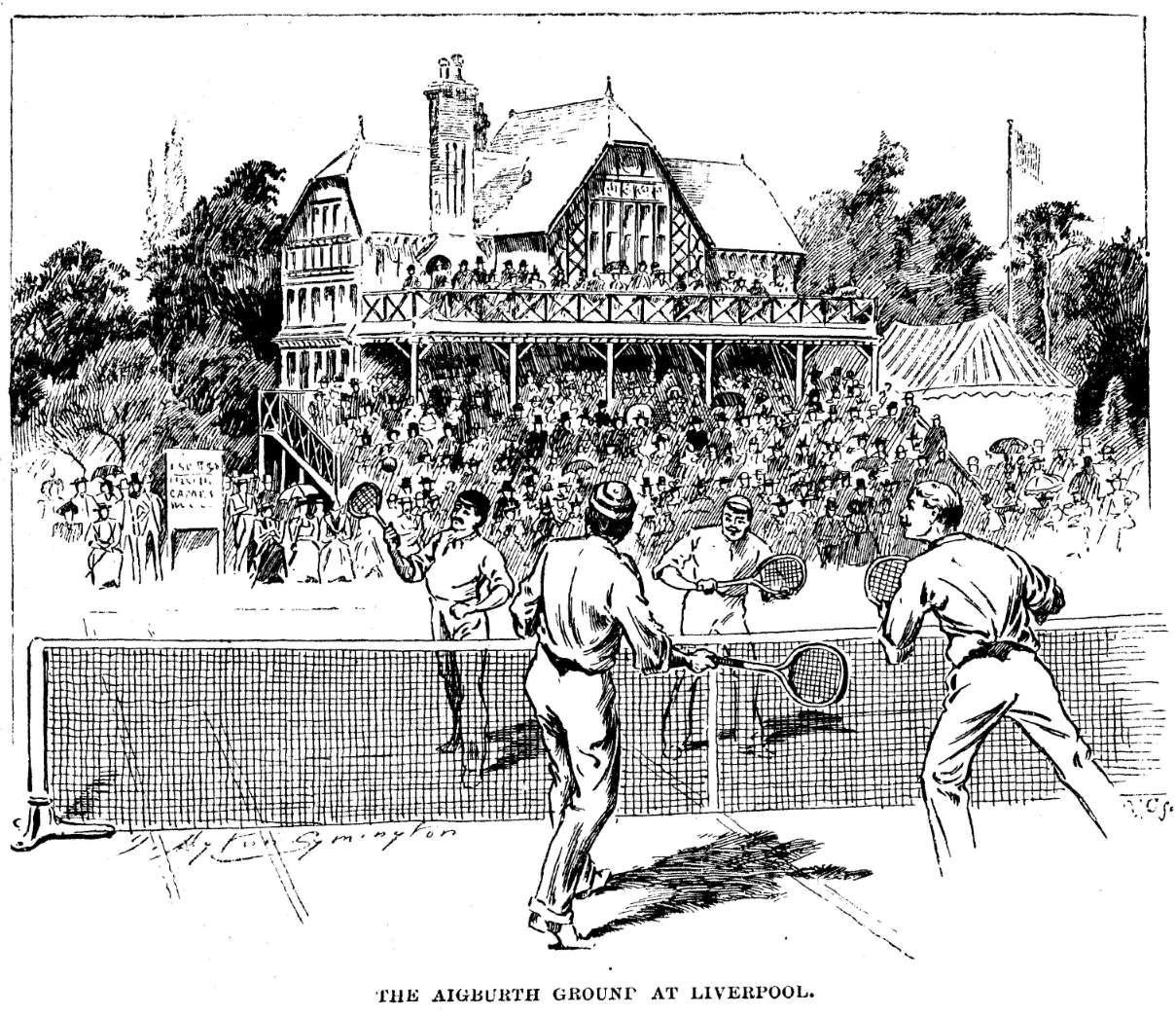
Tennis in Liverpool

=== Book illustration ===
Kirkpatrick lists more than 90 book illustrated by Symington. Symington illustrated three main types of books:

- Adult Novels
- Topographical books, featuring landscapes, cathedrals, and towns.
- Children's adventure books, which formed the bulk of his book illustration work.

Based on the list by Kirkpatrick, the authors whose work was illustrated by Symington include:

- Honoré de Balzac (1799–1850), a French playwright and novelist who is regarded as one of the founders of realism in European literature
- Georgiana Marion Craik (1831–1895), who wrote for young women mostly, but also for girls,.
- Daniel Defoe (c. 1659 – 1731), who wrote Robinson Crusoe and A Journal of the Plague Year among other works.
- Evelyn Everett-Green (1856–1932), who moved from pious stores for children, through historical romances, to adult romances under a range of pseudonyms.
- G. A. Henty (1832–1902), a prolific writer of boy's adventure fiction, often set in a historical context, who had himself served in the military and been a war correspondent.
- Thomas Hughes (1822–1926), an English lawyer, judge, politician, and author, now best remembered for semi-autobiographical Tom Brown's School Days (1857)
- E. C. Kenyon (1854–1925), Edith Caroline Kenton, published more than 50 novels, mainly juvenile fiction, and mostly with the Religious Tract Society as well as translations, biographies, and tracts.
- David Ker (1841–1914), an English journalist, traveller, soldier, and author of juvenile fiction, who based the action in his stories on his own hair-raising experiences.
- Robert Leighton (1858–1934), a Scottish journalist, editor, and a prolific author of juvenile fiction and non-fiction books about dogs and their care.
- Frederick Marryat (1792–1848), a Royal Navy officer who wrote adventure books for children.
- G. B. McKean (1888–1926), Captain George Burdon McKean, a Canadian soldier who won the Victoria Cross in World War I who wrote about his experience in the war.
- L. T. Meade (1844–1914), Elizabeth Thomasina Meade Smith, a prolific Irish writer of stories for girls.
- Ella Edersheim Overton (1864–1947), who contributed to religious-themed magazines and published two novels.
- Charles Eyre Pascoe (1842–1912), who wrote on the stage, travelogues, guides to schools, souvenirs and other works.
- Charles Reade (1814–1884), an English novelist and dramatist,.
- Mary E. Ropes (1842 – ), Mary Emily Ropes
- Herbert Strang (1866–1958), a pair of writers producing adventure fiction for boys, both historical and modern-day.
- Hugh St. Leger (1857–1925), an English journalist and writer of juvenile fiction for boys, mostly adventure stories in a nautical setting.
- H. G. Wells (1866–1946), a prolific English writer, now best remembered for his science fiction.
- Frederick Whishaw (1854–1934), a Russian-born British historian, poet, musician, and author of juvenile fiction.

==== Example of book illustration ====
The following 18 illustrations are a mixture of paintings (12) and pen-and-ink drawings (6) by J Ayton Symington for The Wonderful Wapentake. a collection of stories and essays by fellow Yorkshireman J. S. Fletcher, published by J. Lane, London in 1894. Although this book is a collection of short fiction and non-fiction than a guidebook, these landscape images are typical of Symington's work for topographical books. These images are, by courtesy of the British Library, from the on-line copy at the Library.

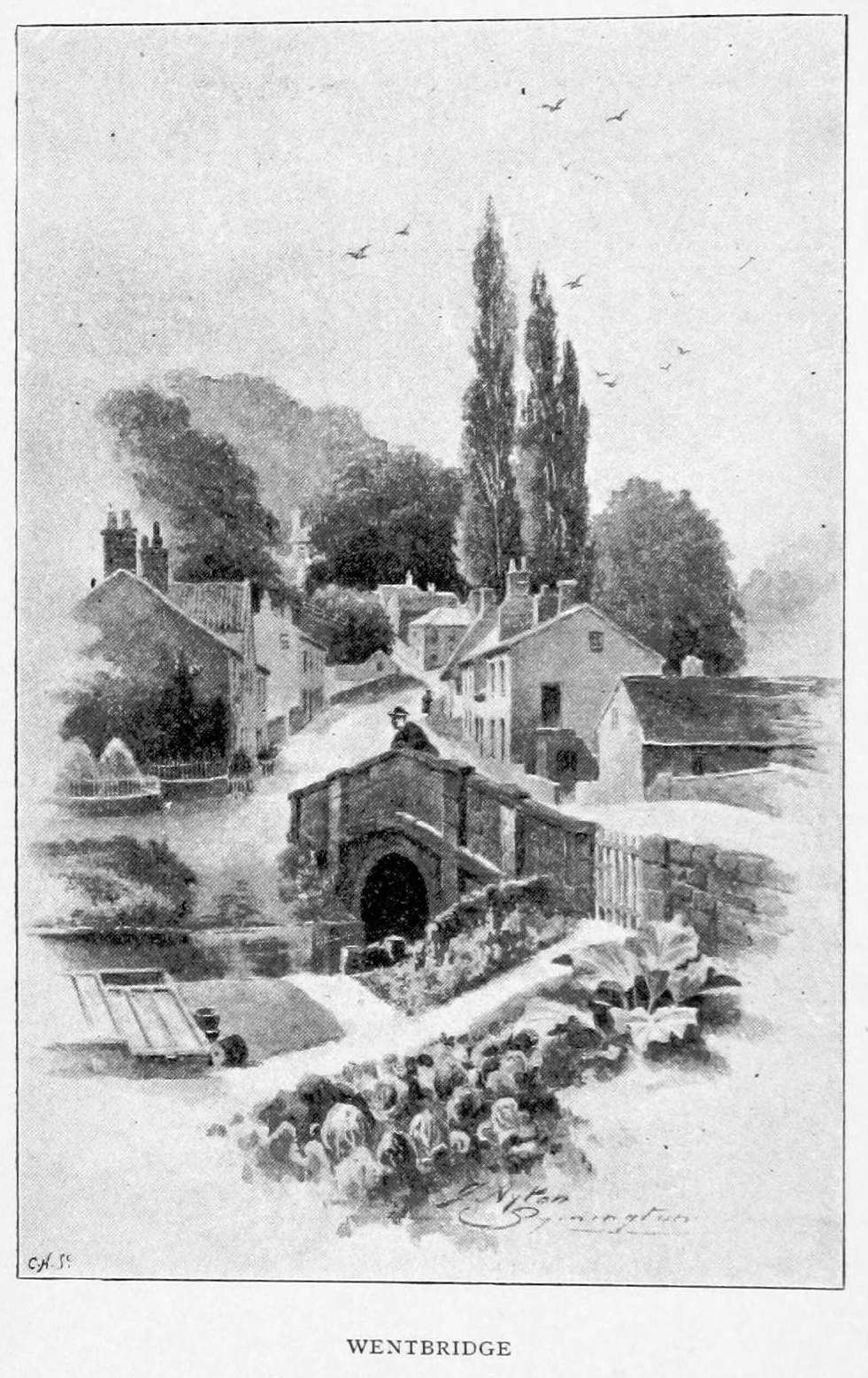
Page 000

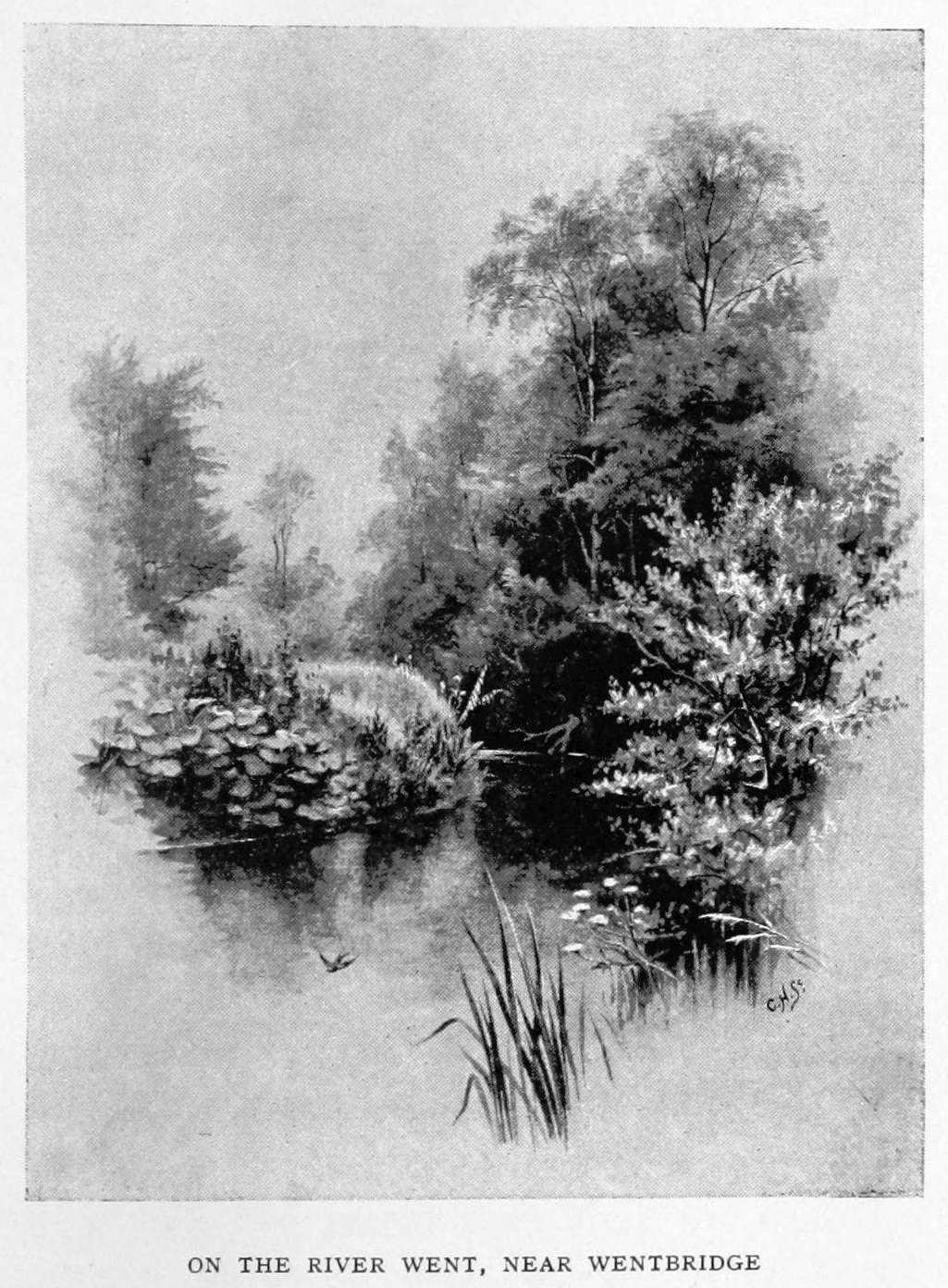
Page 014

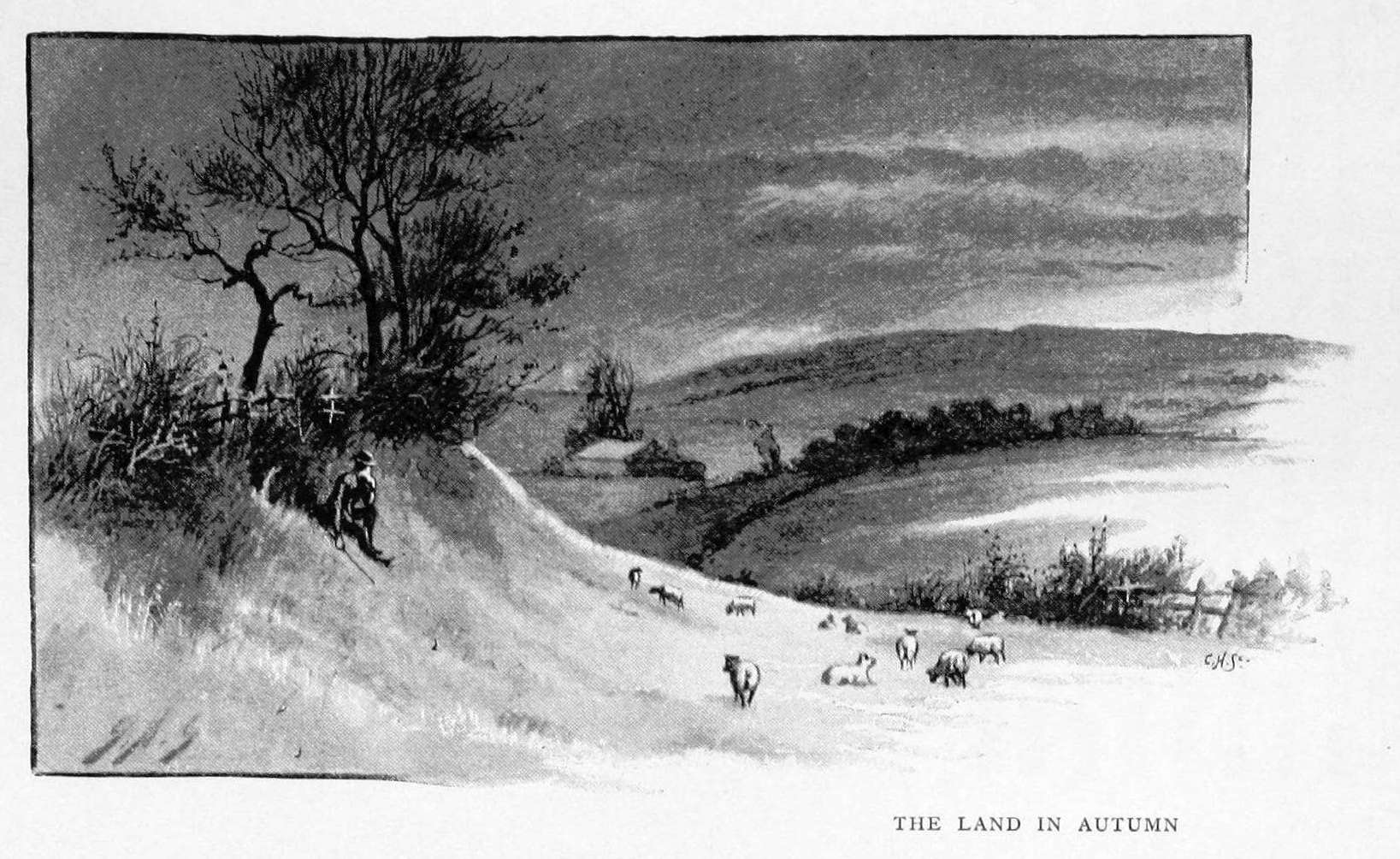
Page 046

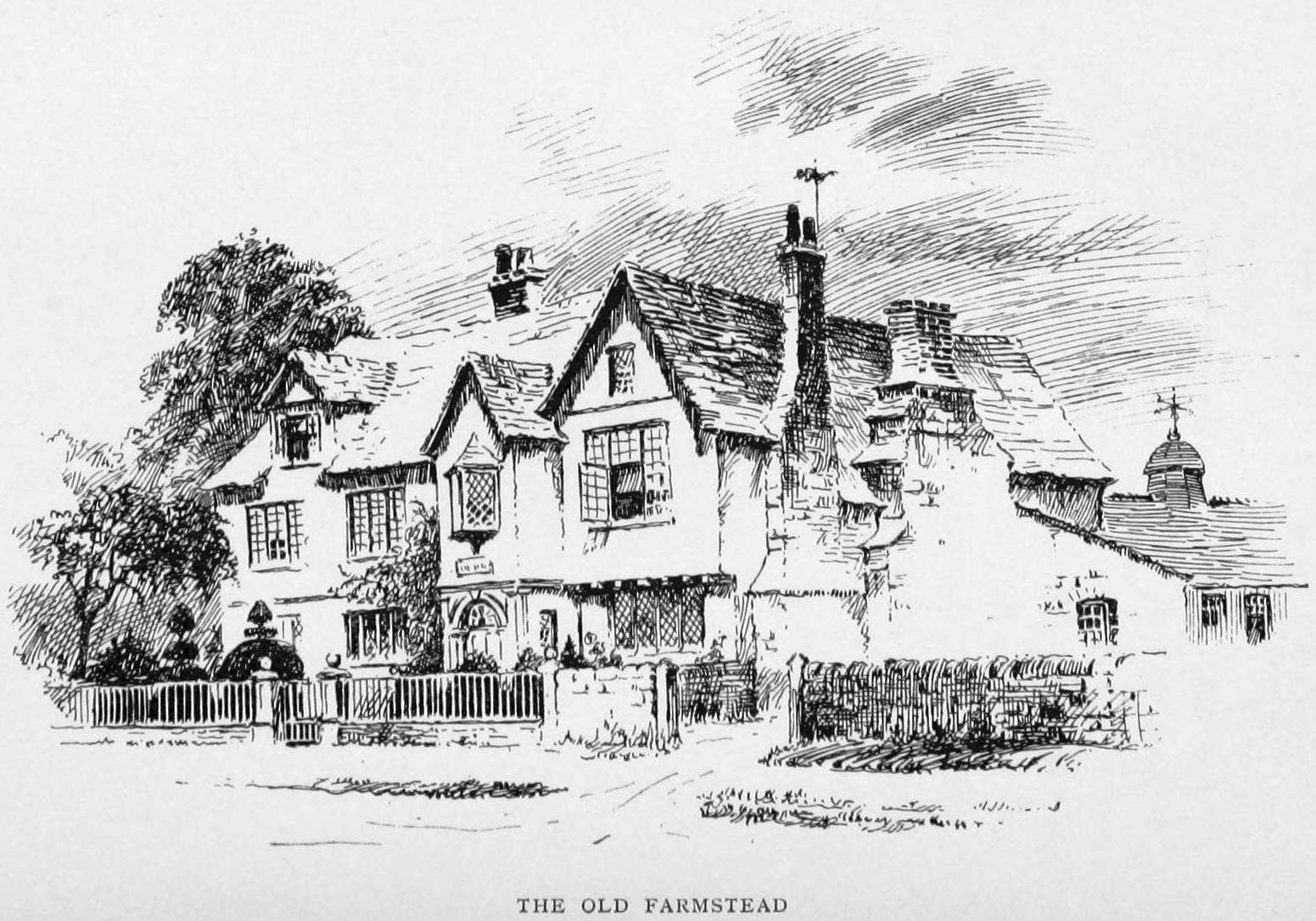
Page 065

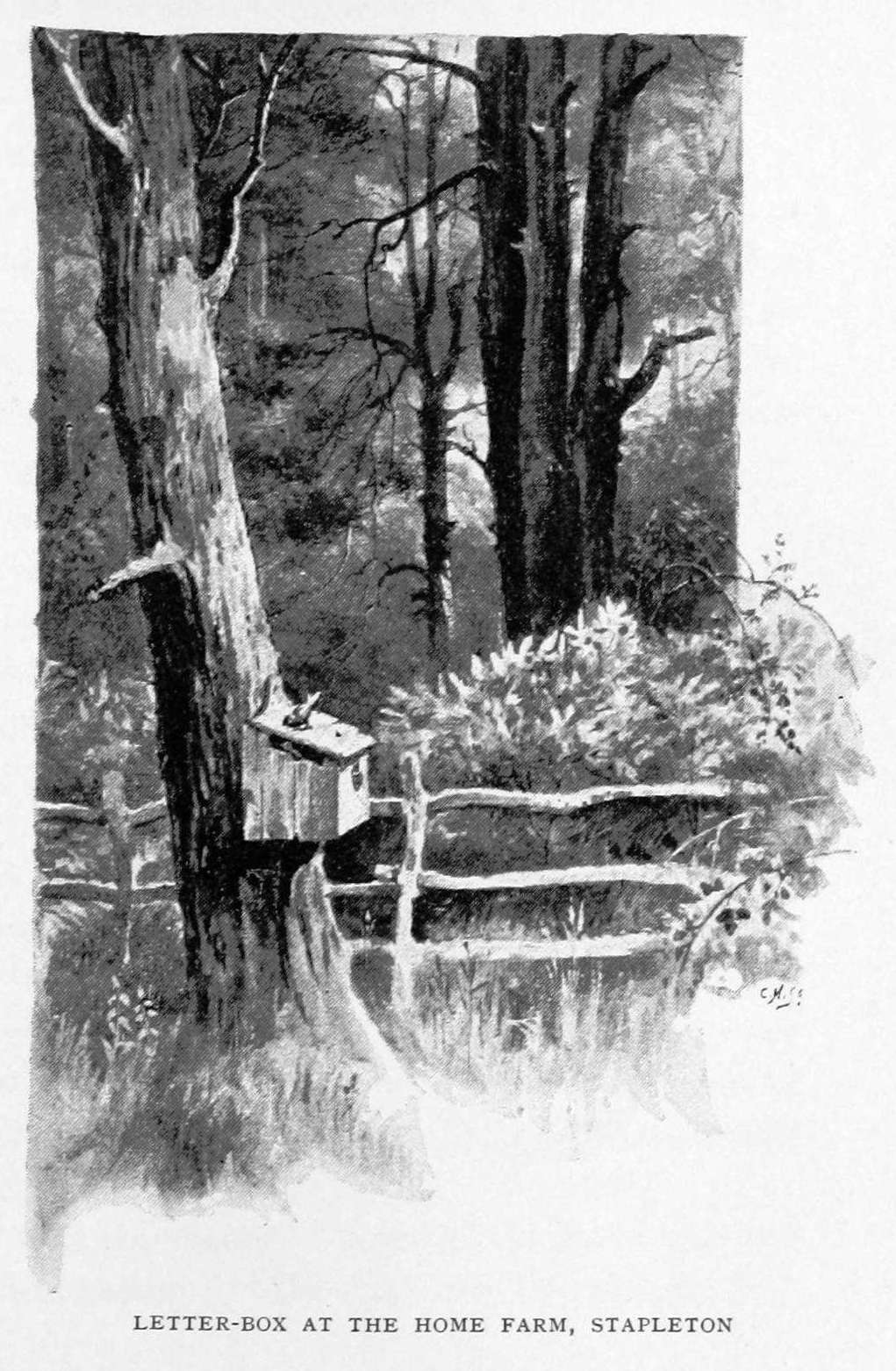
Page 084

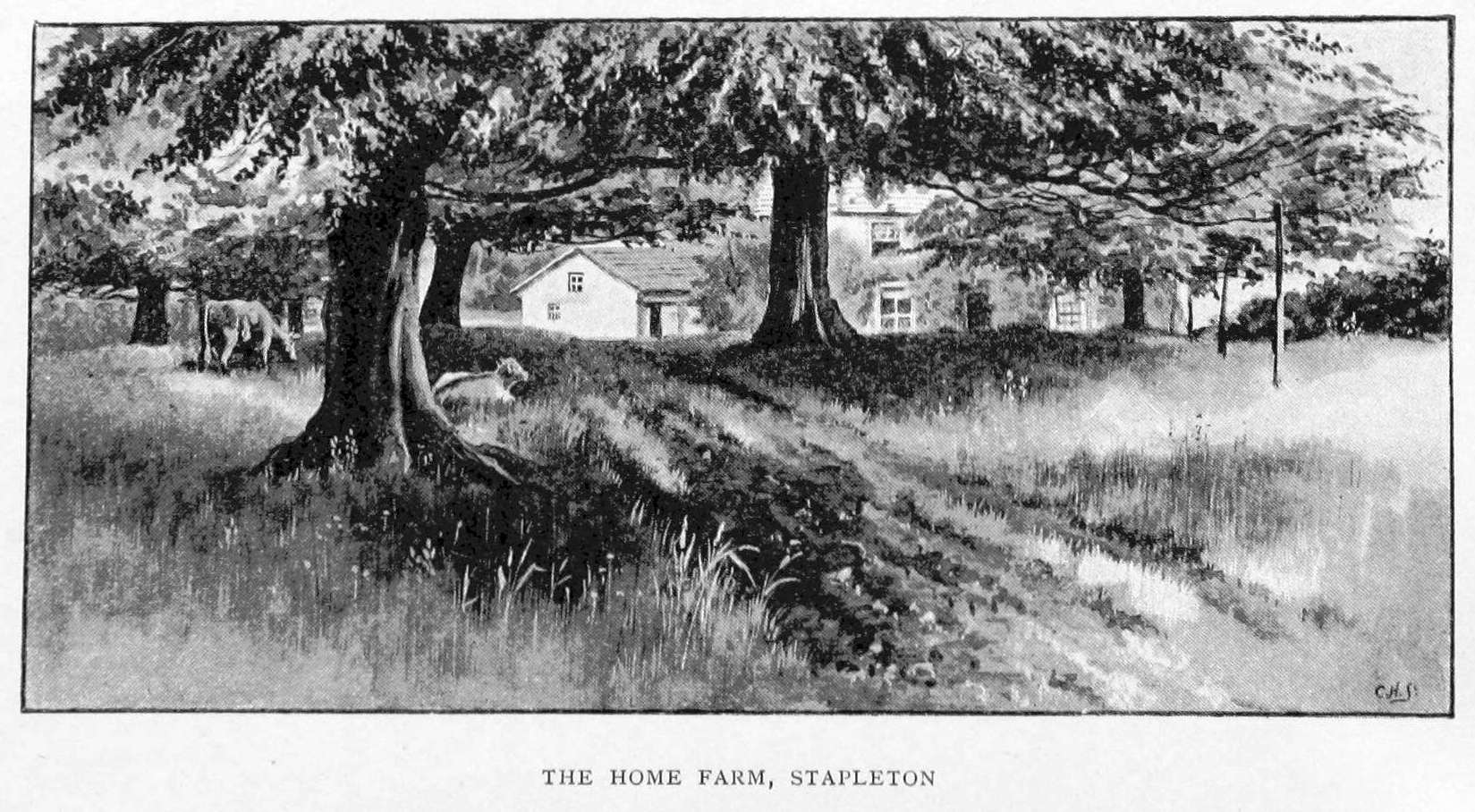
Page 091

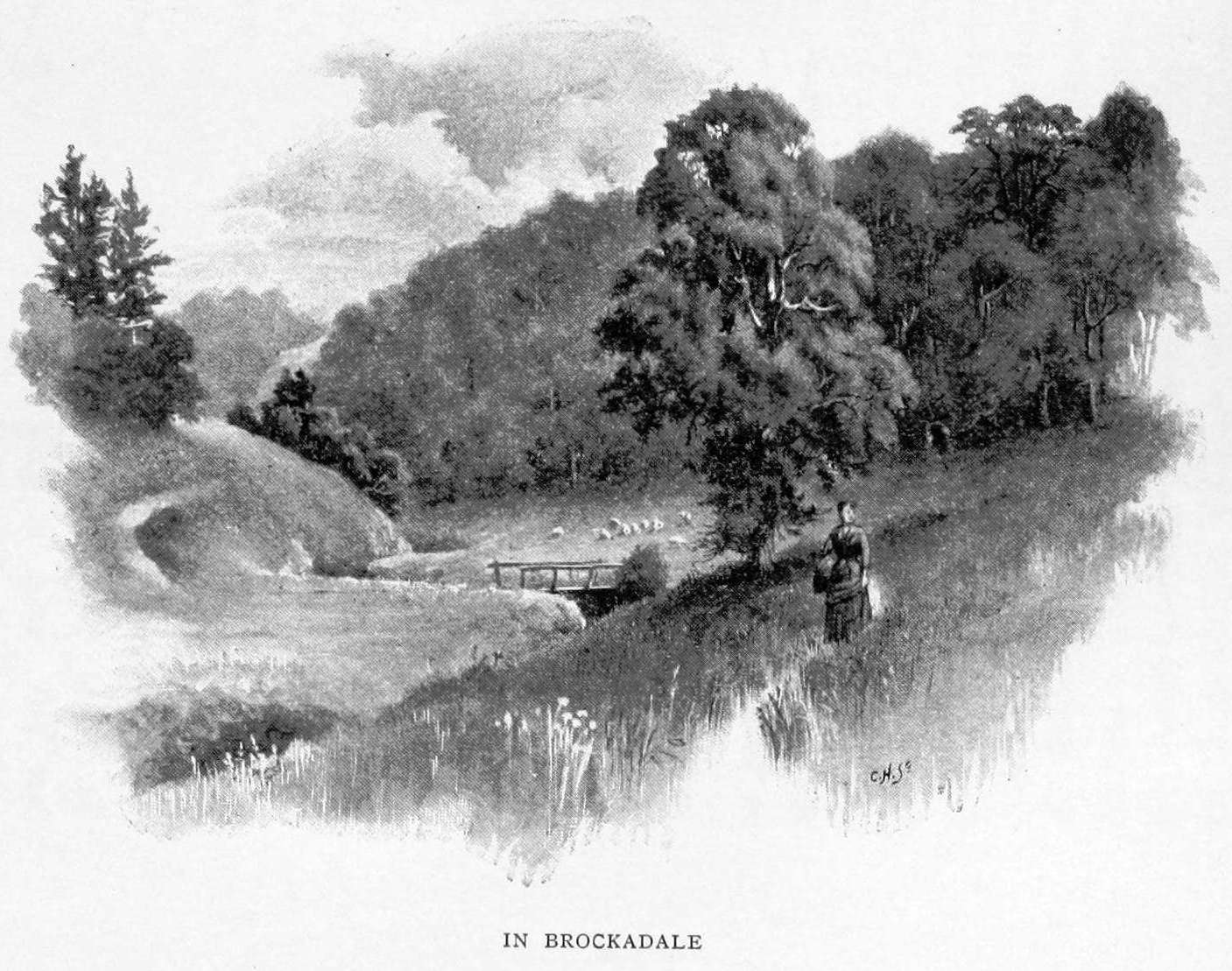
Page 112

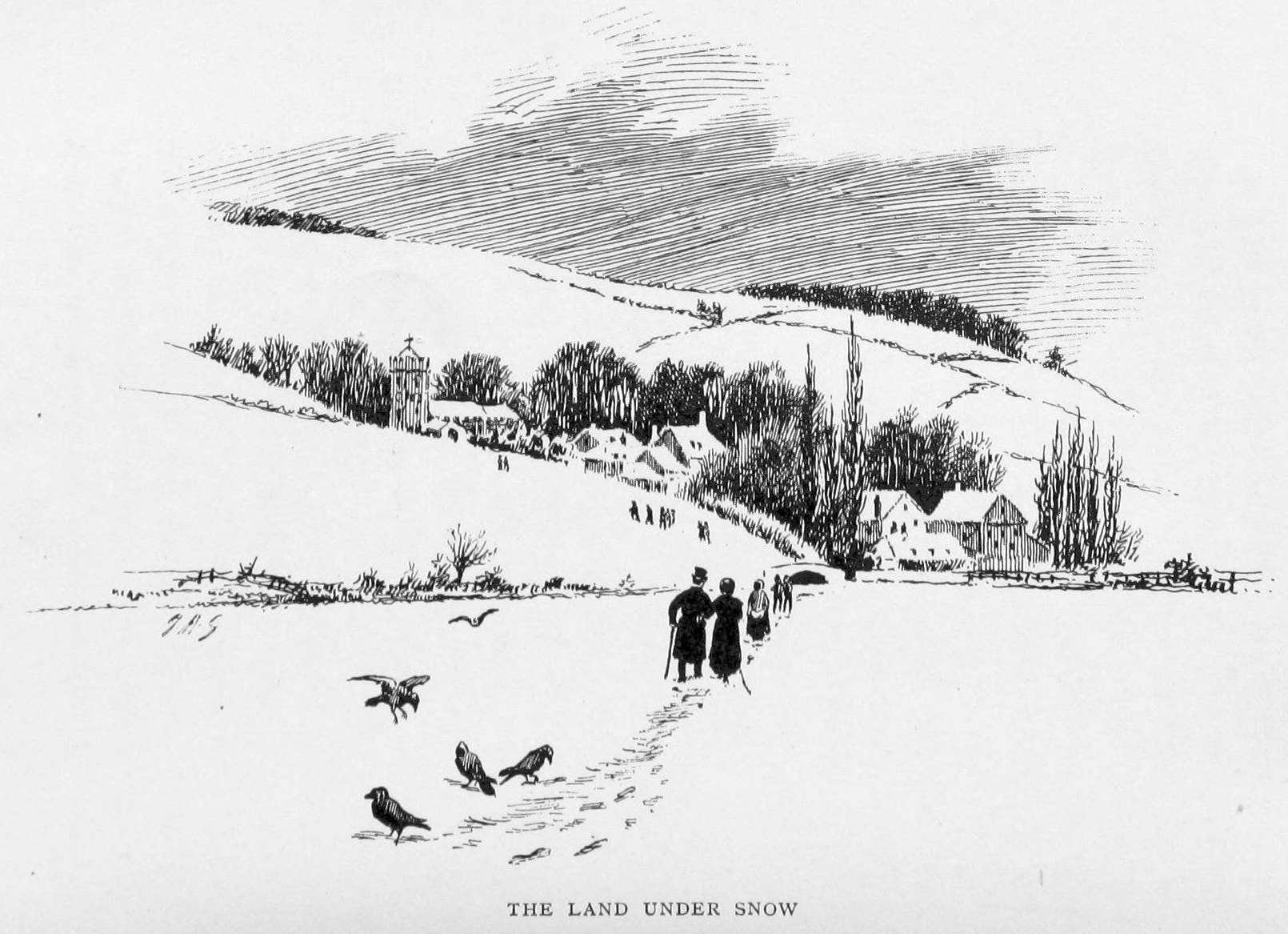
Page 129

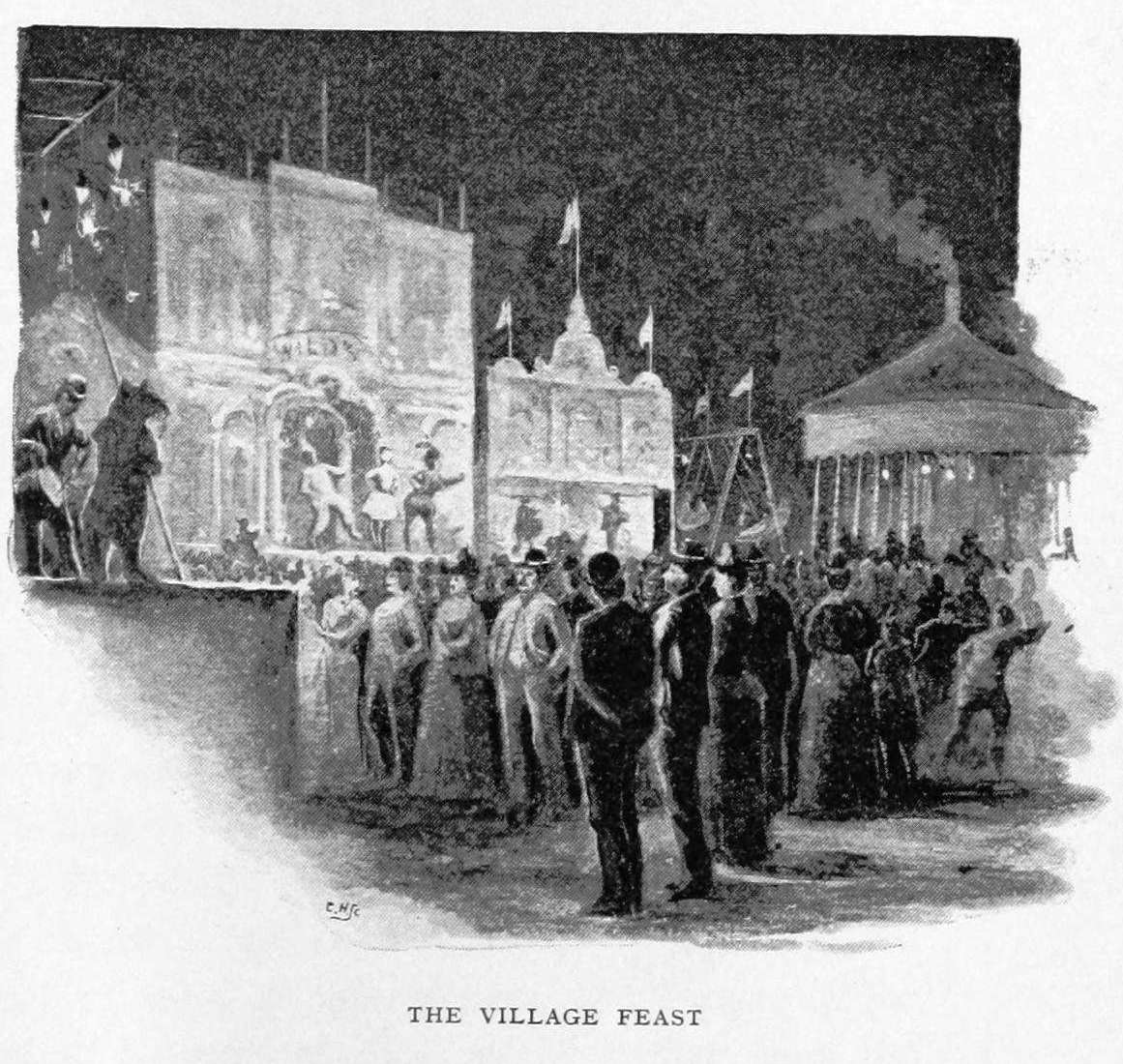
Page 144

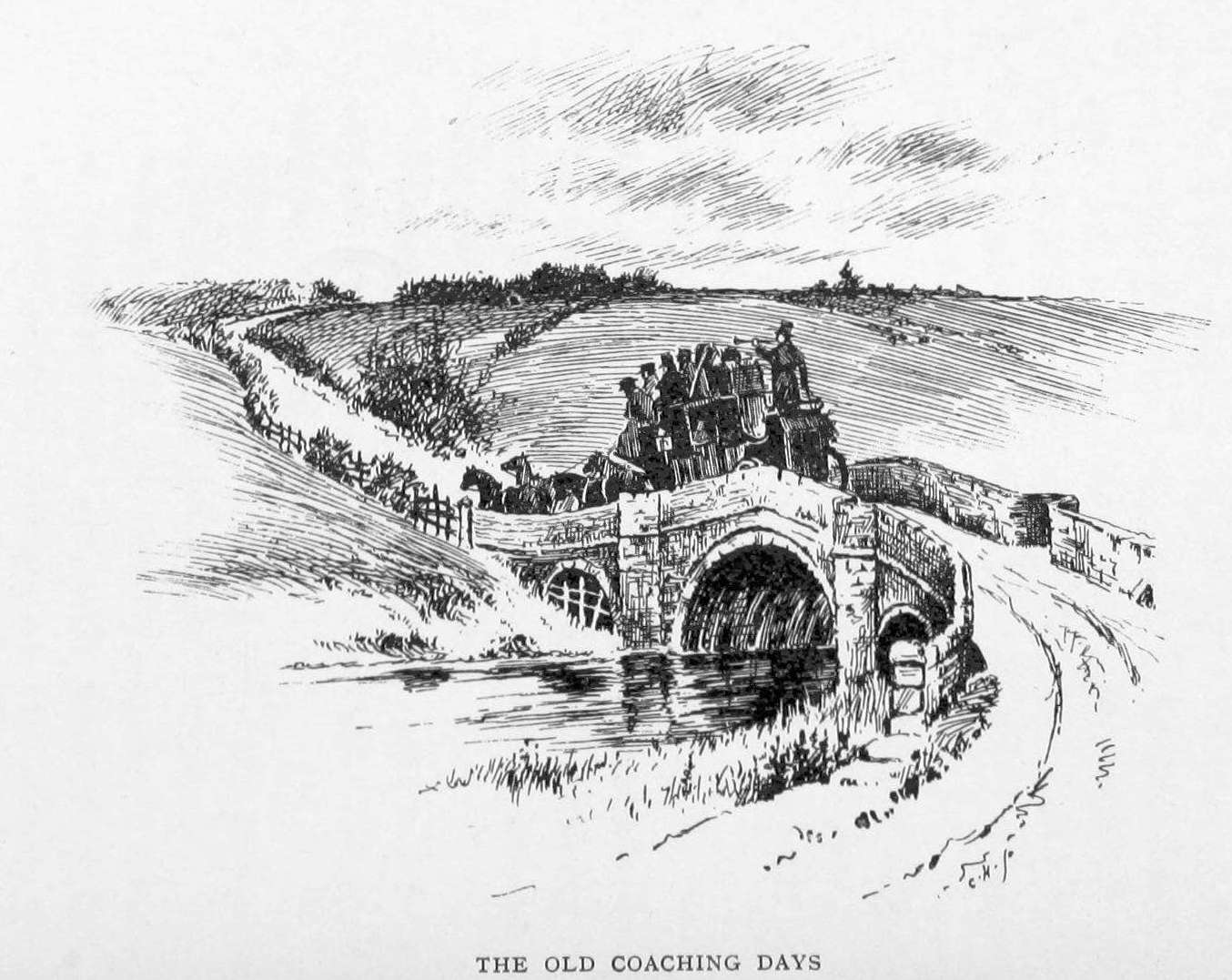
Page 151

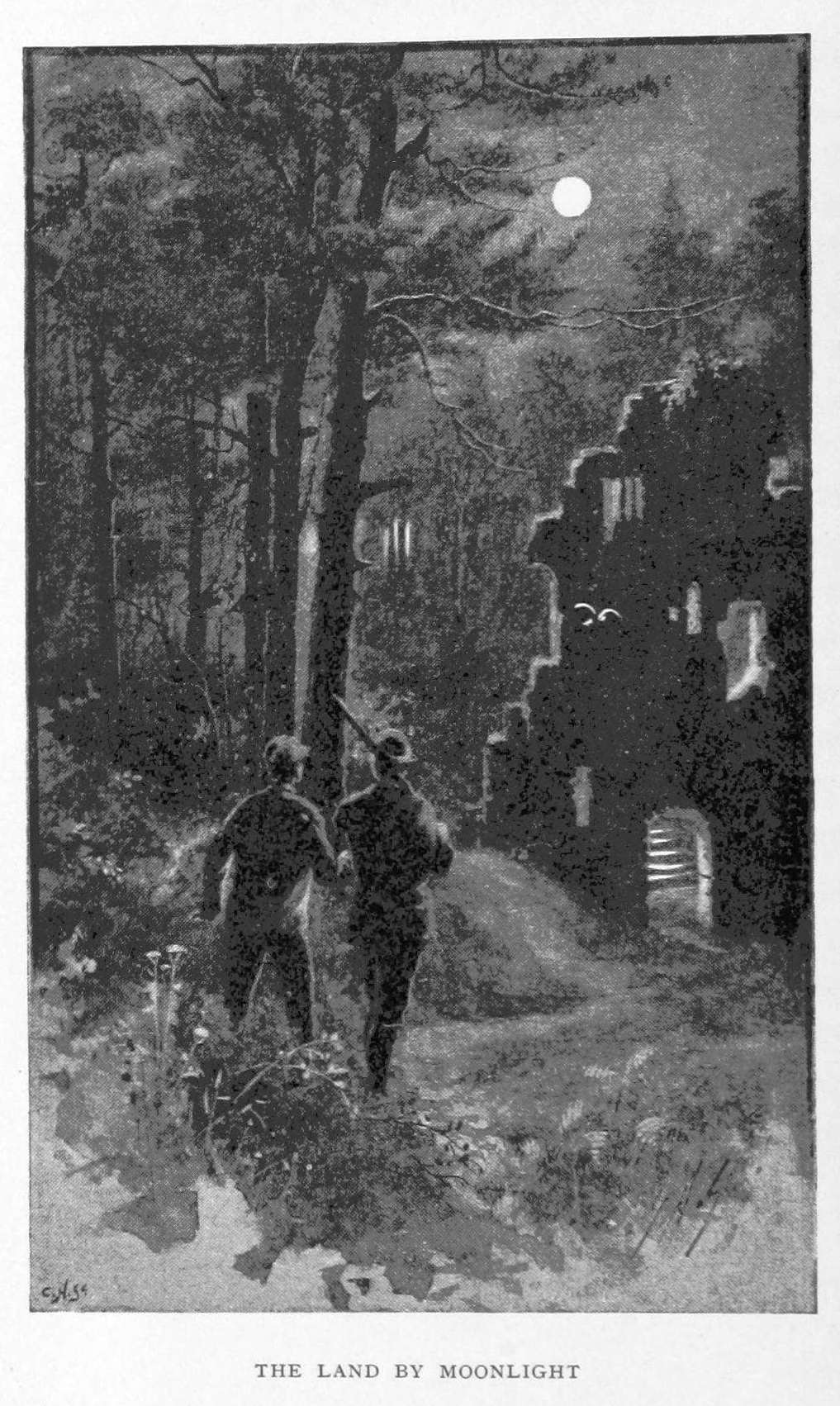
Page 165

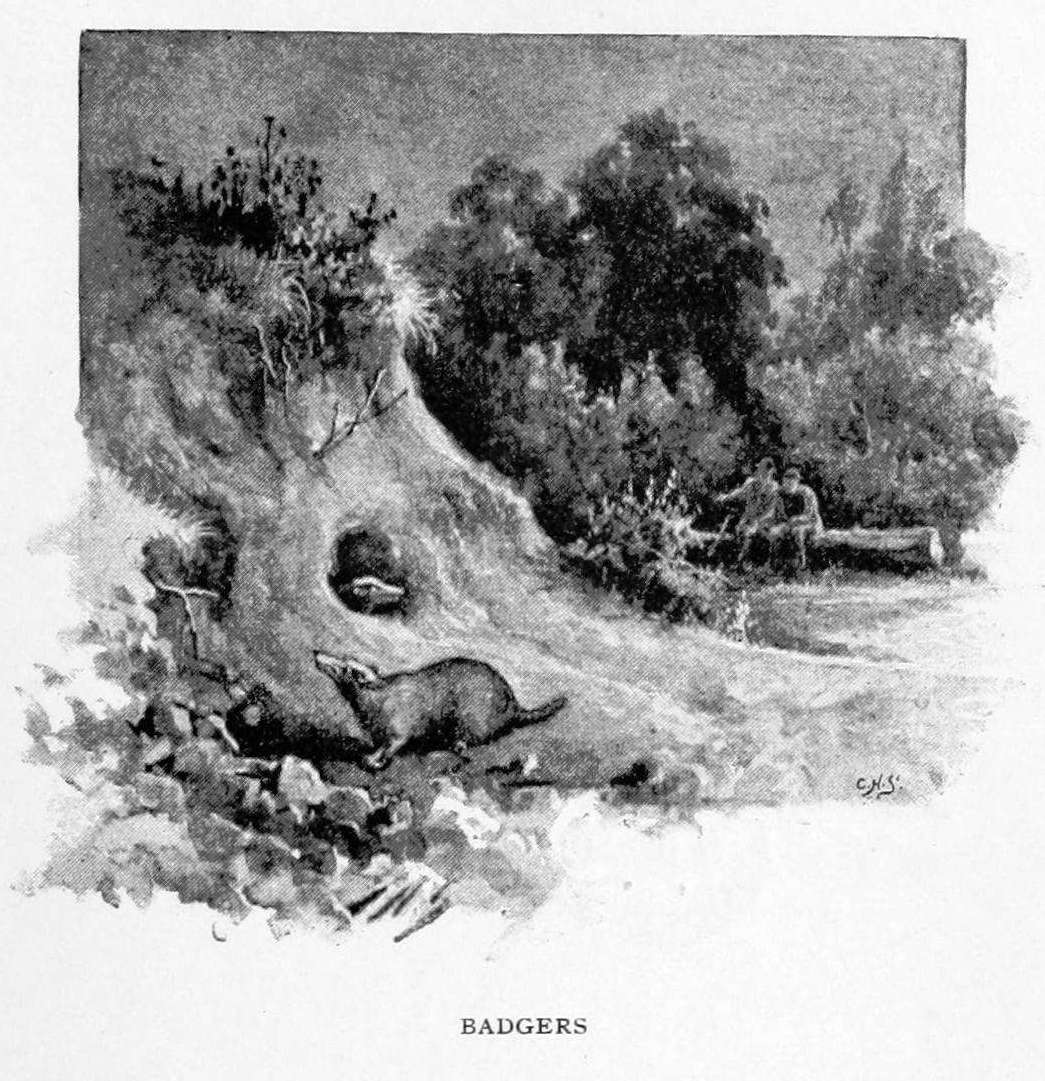
Page 170

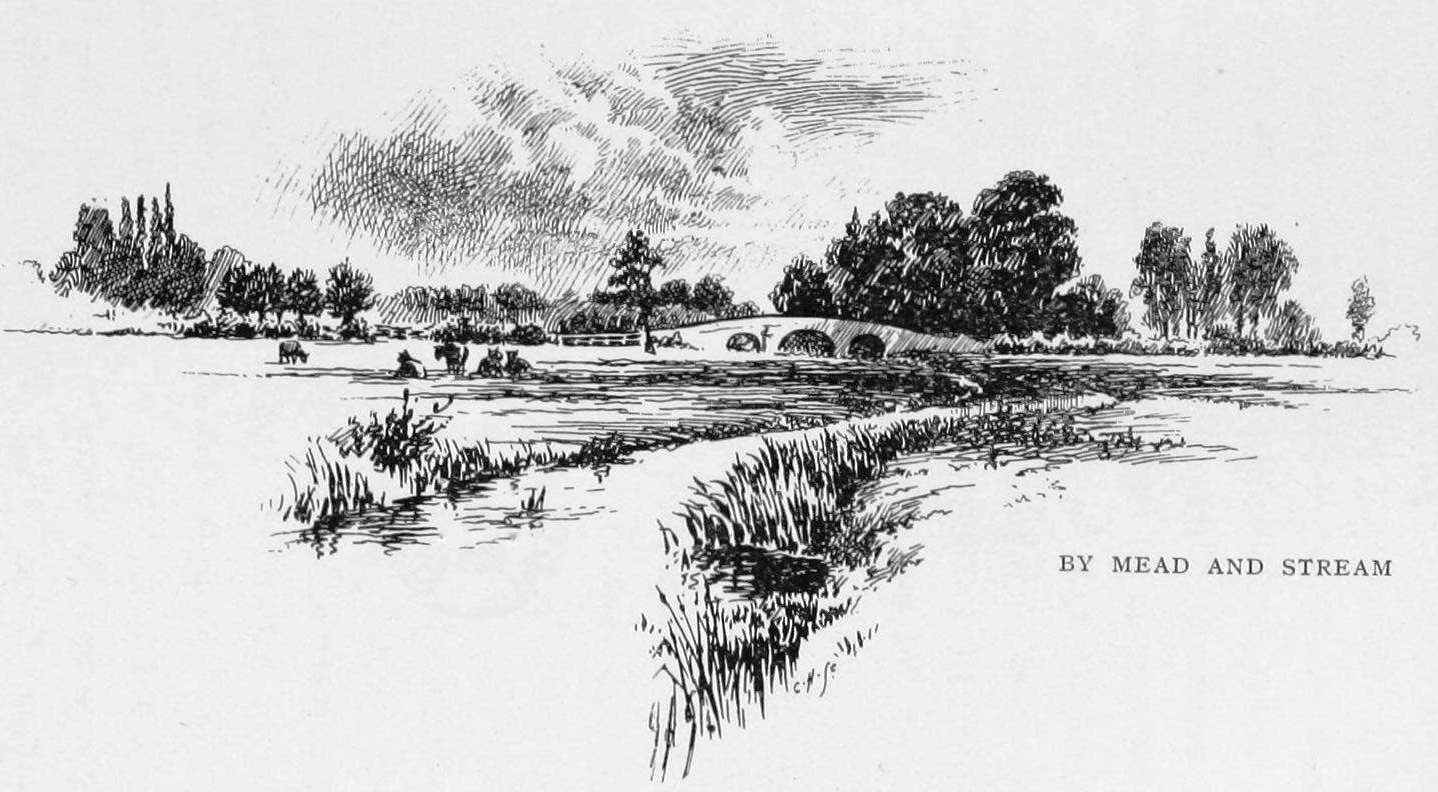
Page 176

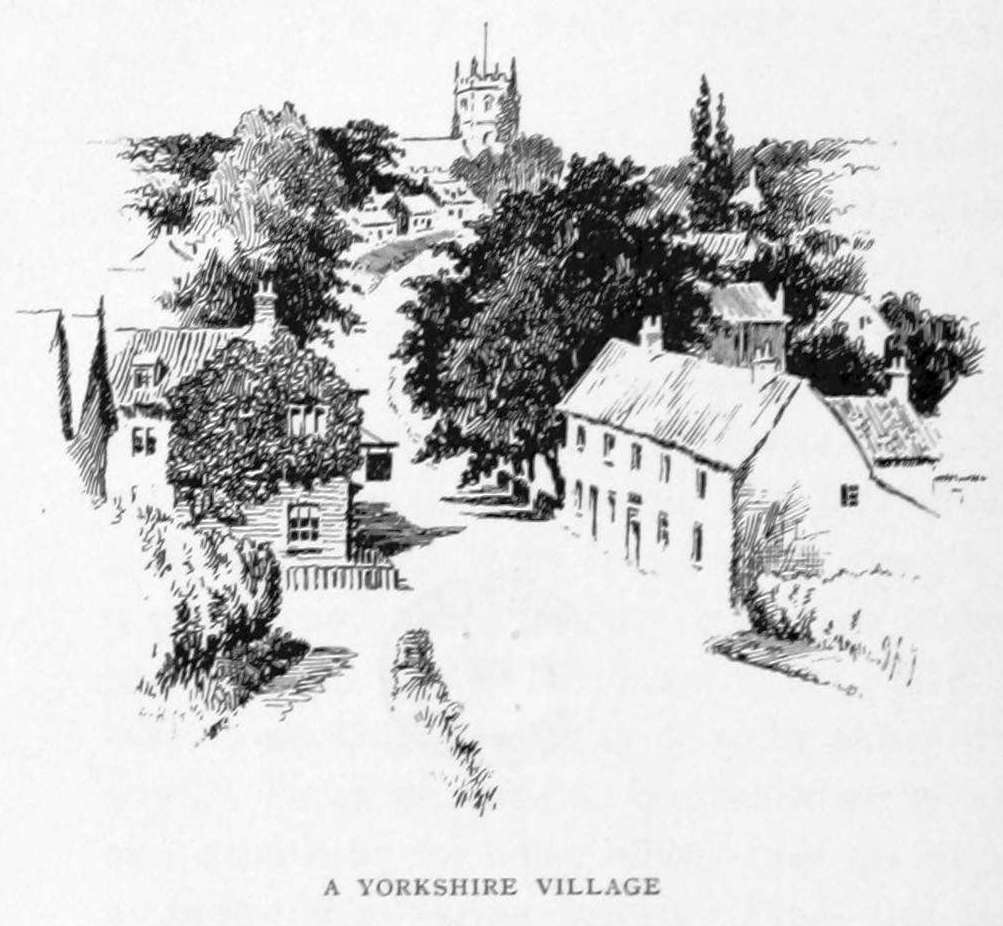
Page 187

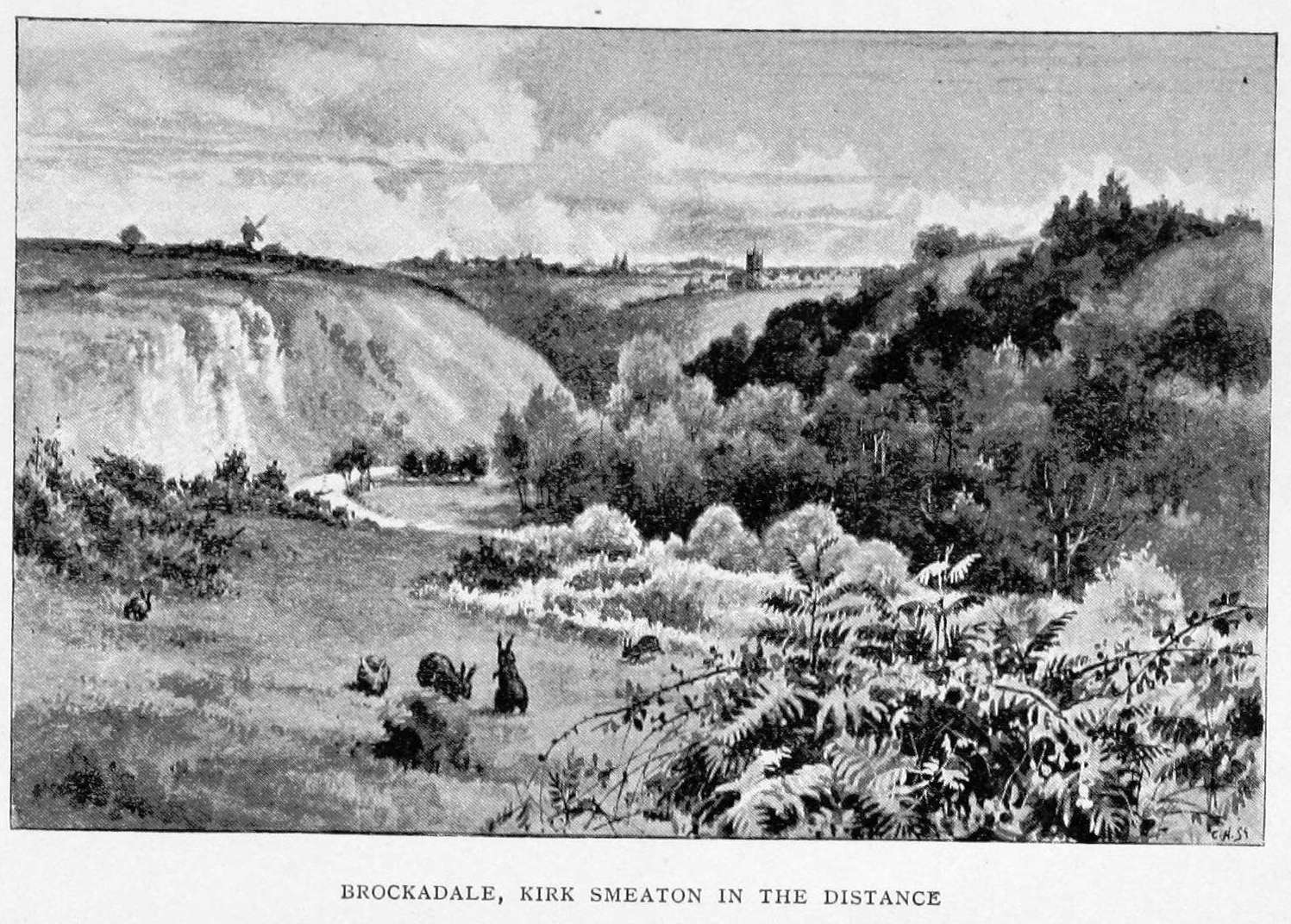
Page 192

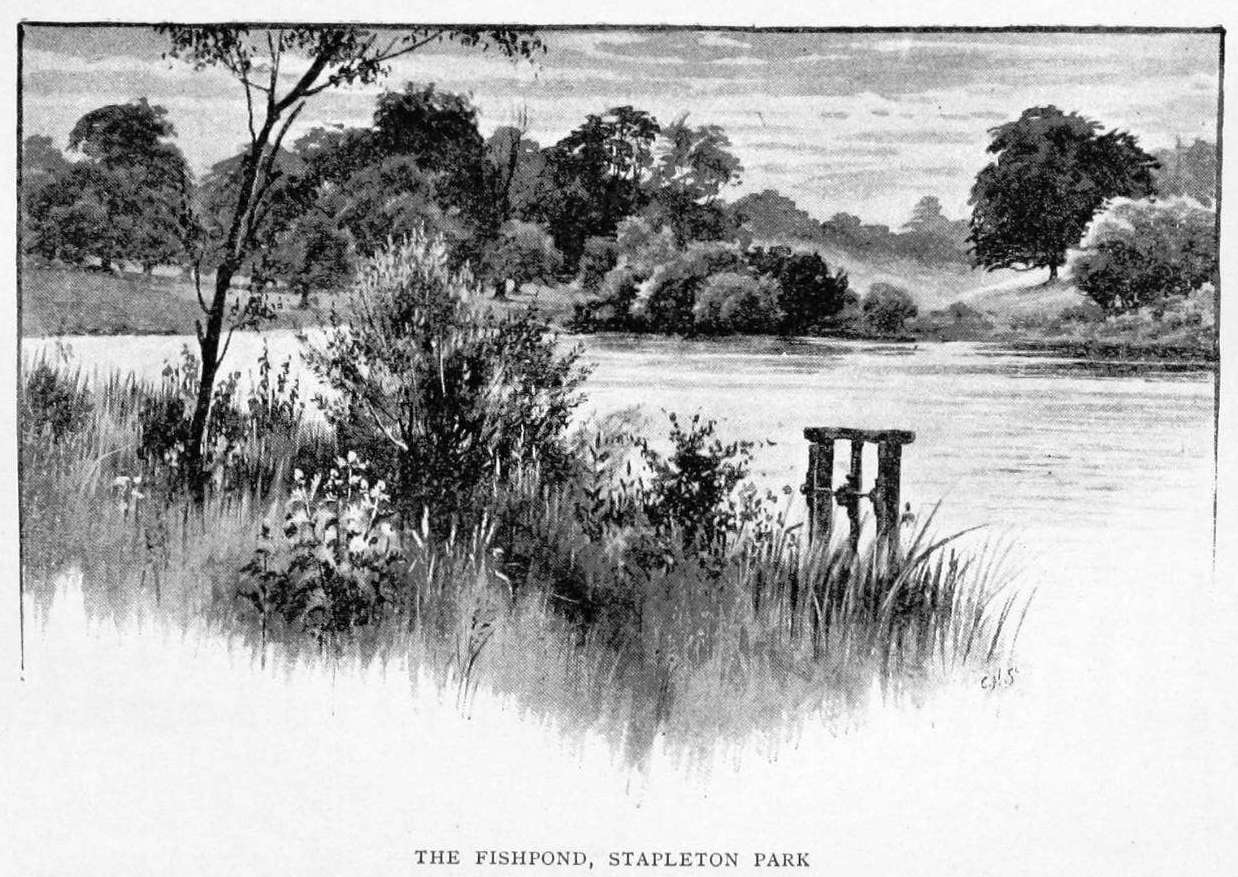
Page 198

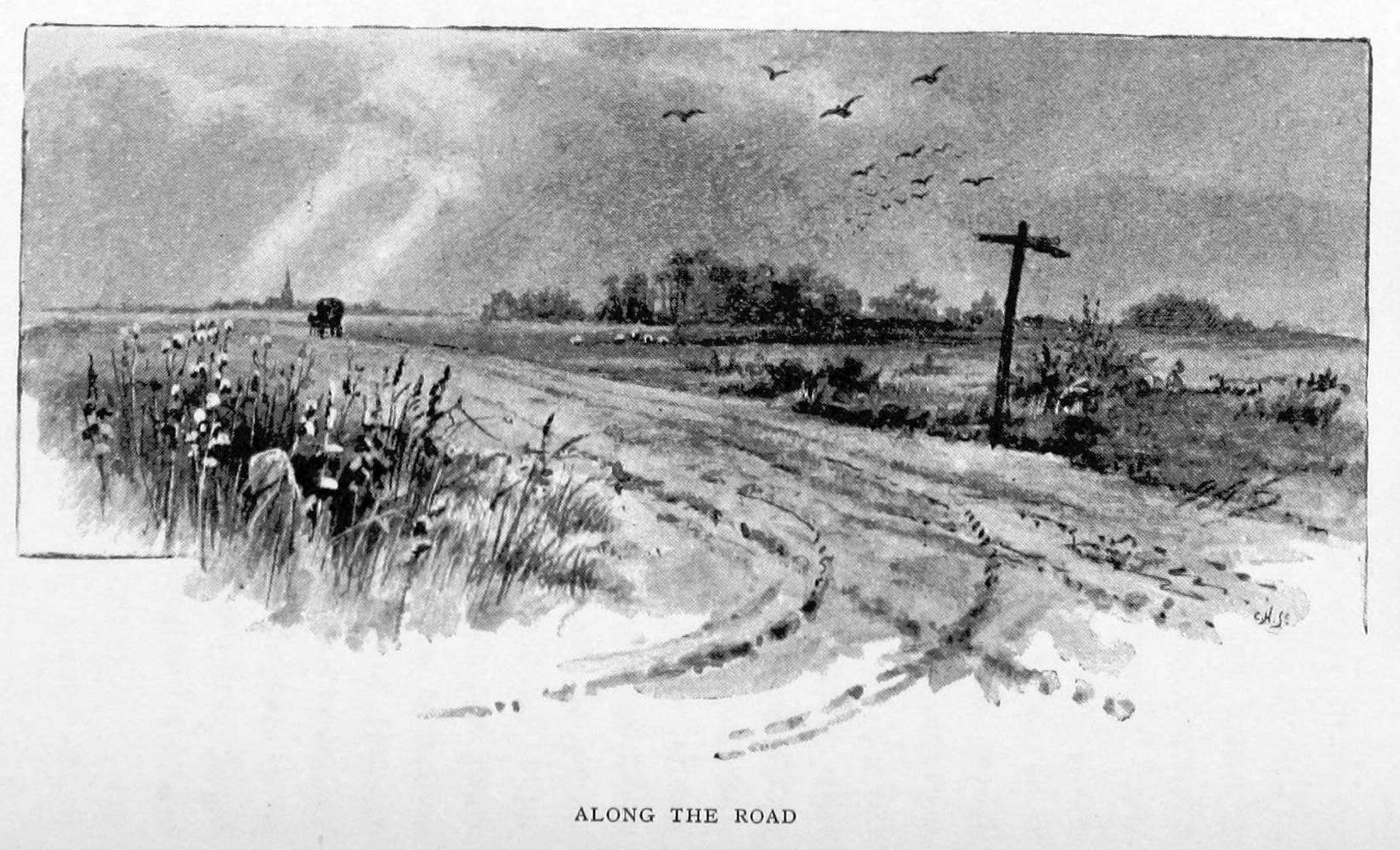
Page 229

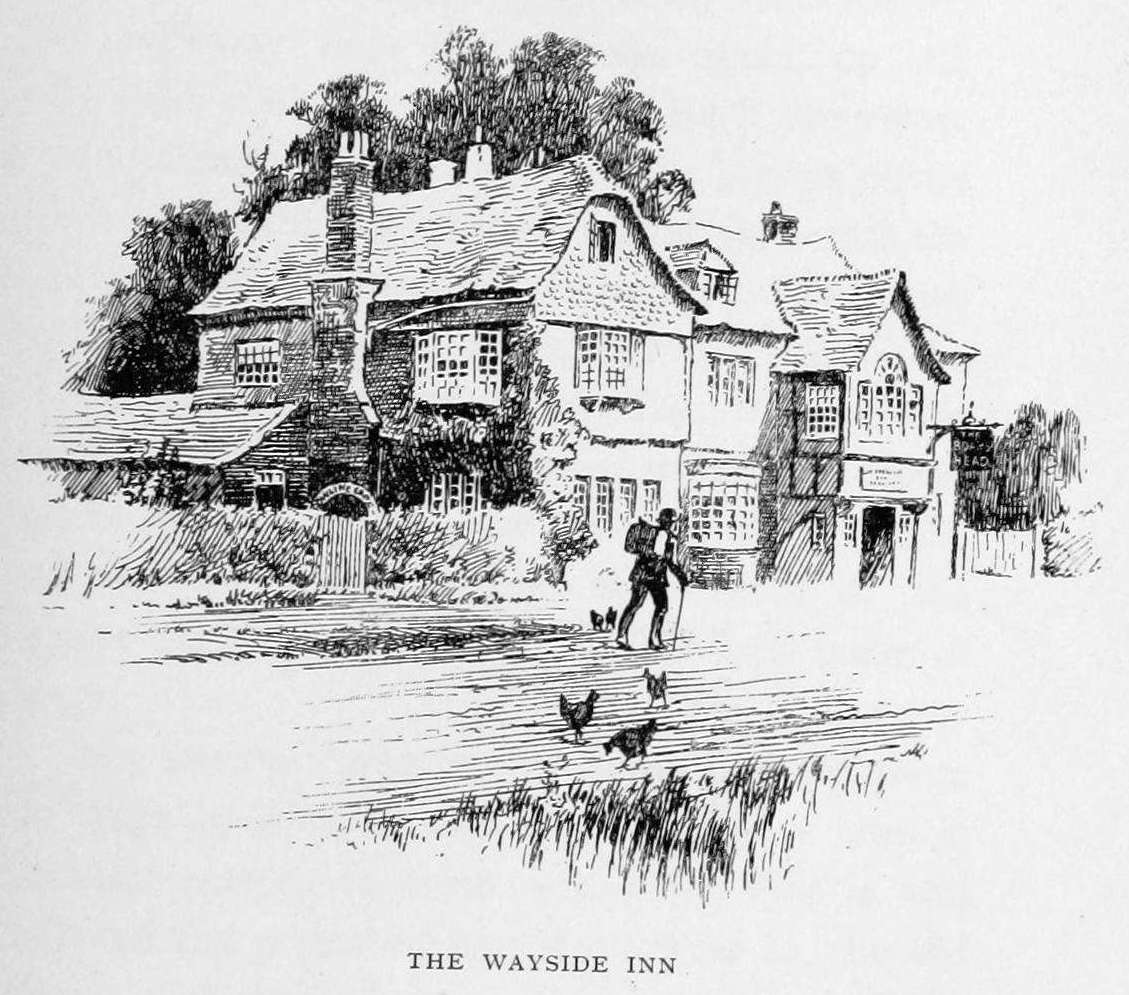
Page 240

== Later life ==
Symington seems to have stopped working by 1914. Kirkpatrick lists no book illustrations by him later than that year, and Hoofe gives his active years as ending in 1908.

Symington was living at Yewby, Yew Tree Gardens, Woodcote Side, Epsom, Surrey when he died on Epsom and Ewell Cottage Hospital on Monday, 6 February 1939. He was buried the following Friday at Lawnwood Cemetery in Leeds. His estate was valued at only £211, 2s and 6d, and his widow was executrix.

== Assessment ==
Blewett considered that Symington's 16 colour and 45 black-and-white illustrations for the 1905 J. M. Dent edition of Defoe's Robinson Crusoe were on the whole superior to rival editions. The Sheffield Independent offered this book as one of a set of six children's classics in a promotional offer in 1934. The Scotsman referred to Symington's work for this book as tasteful coloured illustrations
