= Shurey's Illustrated =

British illustrated newspaper (1899-1903)

- The Most Enterprising of Penny Illustrateds
- Type: Penny Weekly Illustrated Newspaper
- Format: Broadsheet news magazine
- Owner: Charles Shurey
- Editor: Charles Shurey
- Founded: October 14, 1899
- Ceased publication: June 17, 1903
- Headquarters: Caxton House, Gough Square, Fleet Street, London, England
- Sister newspapers: Shurey's Pictorial Budget

Shurey's Illustrated was a one penny weekly illustrated newspaper launched during the Second Anglo-Boer War. While other illustrated papers launched at the time, such as The Illustrated War News, focused on the war, Shurey's Illustrated also covered other topics, including sports and social events. It was one of a stable of one-penny weekly illustrated papers managed by Charles and Henry Shurey.

== Publishing History ==
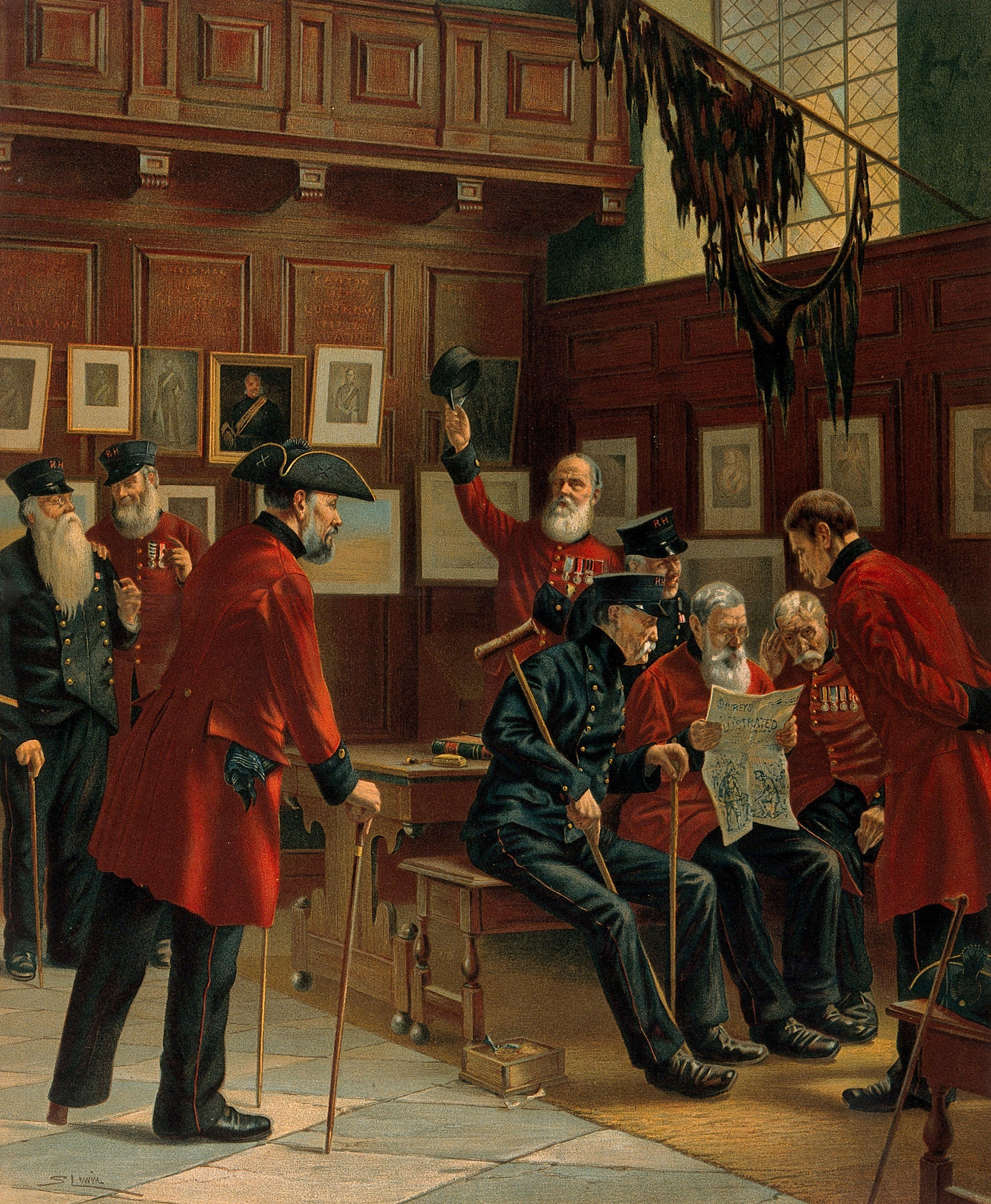
A group of Chelsea Pensioners grouped around a colleague reading Shurey's Illustrated

Shurey's Illustrated was published weekly from 14 October 1899 – 17 June 1903. Initially it focused on the Second Anglo-Boer War and the first edition was described as a regular war number The paper was printed on art paper, and the editor and proprietor Charles Shurey boasted that he had brought out a first class illustrated paper for one Penny. He also stated that he had been overwhelmed with illustrations and material from his war correspondents, but Greenwall doubted that he had any. However, Mr. E. R. Hawkins left Southampton aboard the Pembroke Castle on 27 January 1900 to serve as a Special Artist on the front for the paper.

The paper gave increasing attention to sports over time. In June 1901, they featured a half page engraving of the Worcestershire Cricket team, together with text about the team and the season which they had had. The paper turned increasing attention to football and a splendid portrait of the Lincoln City team, together with copious notes appeared in January 1902. The advertisements for the paper stated that who wanted to know how Lincoln City could win the Association Cup should read the paper. Starting with issue No. 50, (22 September 1900) the paper began to provide full page photographs of famous footballers. The series ran until 19 January 1901. Starting with issue No. 54 (20 October 1900) the paper began to provide full page photographs of football teams, ending on 16 February 1901.

== Shurey's Pictorial Budget ==
The newspaper spawned Shurey's Pictorial Budget in 1900. It was subtitled: Best Pictures and Photos from the Front. This ran for twelve issues only, from 10 February 1900 – 7 May 1900. It was then incorporated with Shurey's Illustrated. The pictorial budget had no text apart from captions and cost 1½ pence.

The Imperial War Museum holds issues Nos. 1, 2, 4, 7, 8, 9, 10 (without cover), 11 and 12, as physical copies. They are not online. The British Library holds all 12 issues, again as physical copies, and without them being online.

== Contributors ==
Charley Shurey sseected his artists with discrimination, and was very popular with them, especially the younger and less established artists, as he paid cash on the spot for the drawings he purchased. The contributors, to both newspapers included:

- Frank Feller, who was one of the principal illustrators
- Ernest Shérie, Who eventually became art editor of The Strand Magazine.
- J. H. Thornely, the equestrian illustrator. He also worked for Harmsworth.
- Arthur J. Gough, who also worked for Harmsworth.
- Edgar Alfred Holloway, the children's book illustrator.
- Malcolm Patterson, a black and white artist, etcher and illustrator.
- Frank Hardy, Dudley Hardy's brother.
- Frank M. Barton
- Savile Lumley, children's book illustrator and the designer of the well-known World War I recruitment poster 'Daddy, What did YOU do in the Great War?' (Note: Peppin and Micklethwait incorrectly state that he was active from c. 1910, whereas he was illustrating earlier than this.)

== Advertising rates and circulation ==
The advertising rates for the Illustrated were twelve shillings per column-inch for a single insertion, and ten shillings per column-inch for insertions that appeared at least 13 times.

The circulation numbers are not stated, (Note: Given the focus on the War in South Africa, it is probably that the circulation varied with the war news generally.) but the paper contributed 2,960 shillings (£148) to the Daily Telegraph shilling fund for soldiers' widows and orphans, being the profit on the Christmas 1900 edition of the paper. Given that the usual prices was one penny, this suggests that the circulation must have been many tens of thousands. Considering that the advertising rates were similar to weekly papers with circulations over 120,000:

- Something to Read a one penny weekly magazine (12s. and 10s.) with a guaranteed circulation of 132,158.
- Sketchy Bits, another one penny illustrated weekly paper published by Shurey, (12s. and 11s.) with an average circulation of 145,000.
- Police Budget another one penny illustrated weekly paper published by Shurey (10s.) with a circulation of over 150,000.

Charles Shurey declared, one year after first publication, that the audited annual circulation was 9,920,500, which would give an average weekly circulation of 190,779.
