= Frank Feller =

Swiss artist & illustrator (1848–1908)

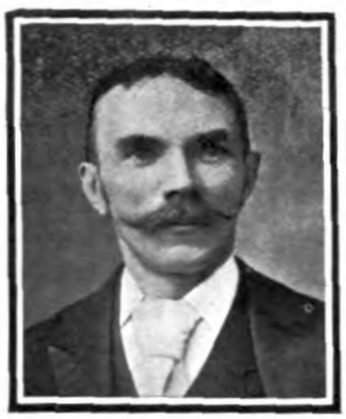
- Obituary Photograph of Frank Feller. The Sphere, 21 March 1908, p. 238.
- Born: 28 October 1848; Bümpliz-Oberbottigen, Bern, Switzerland
- Died: 6 March 1908 (aged 59); Earls Court, London, England
- Other names: Signed his work either Frank Feller in caps, or with his monogram
- Occupations: Painter and illustrator
- Years active: 1870–1908
- Known for: Postcard painting and military pictures
- Notable work: Last Eleven at Maidan

Frank Feller (1848–1908) was a Swiss artist who settled in England and made a career as an illustrator and painter. He was particularly well known as a painter of military scenes and as a painter of postcards.

== Early life ==
Feller was born on 28 October 1848 in Bümpliz-Oberbottigen, a district of the city of Bern, Switzerland. He trained in Geneva, Munich, Paris, and London.

== Settling in England ==
By 1871 Feller was a boarder at 6 Euston Grove, St Pancras, London with the profession of Artist. Ten years later, in 1881, he was now a naturalised British subject. He was lodging at 9 Rowland Street, St. Pancras, London.

== Marriage and family ==
Feller married Christine Heuser (Note: Her surname is sometimes spelled Henser, as on her father's naturalisation declaration, rather than Heuser.) (Q2 1863 – 15 June 1930) on 19 December 1882 at All Saints' Church in Wandsworth, London. Christine had been born in St. George in the East. Her father, Balthazar Heuser (c. 1832 – 8 June 1887), ran a Public House here, the Bee-Hive at 71 Christian Street, Whitechapel, London. Her father was a German immigrant who became a naturalised British citizen in 20 April 1874.

The couple had eight children:

- Victor Maximilian Feller (26 February 1886 – 1969) became an engineer, married Nellie Lillian Kentish (c. 1882 – 11 September 1971), emigrated to Quebec, Canada in c. 1905, (Note: On returning from a short trip to England in August 1920, he stated that he and Nellie have been 15 years in Canada.) and had at least three children.
- Elizabeth Louise Marie Feller (26 Feb 1889 – ) married Fritz Georg Rauschenback (c.1886 – ), a German bank clerk working in London, in Hackney, London, in the first quarter of 1912. The couple remained in London until 1914, but it is not known how they were affected by the outbreak of the First World War.
- Margarite Alexandra Christina Feller (21 December 1890 – 23 May 1955) married Charles Chitty Sears (5 February 1878 – 1931), a metal merchant's clerk, at the Parish Church in Romford, on 1 September 1914.
- Frank Charles Feller (Q4 1892 – )
- Gordon Montague Feller (14 June 1897 – 1 June 1971) served with the Royal Engineers in the First World War, arrived as an emigrant in Canada on 30 October 1920, and immediately joined Canadian Explosives Ltd, a DuPont Company, as a maintenance technician. He married Florence Alberta Tobin (26 October 1896 – 17 December 1971), a US Citizen with a Canadian father in 1924. He was transferred first to the Arlington Company, in New Jersey, the forerunner of the DuPont's plastics department, and later to DuPont's experimental station in Delaware, where he ended his career as a draftsman after nearly forty years with the company.
- Robert Rudolf Balthasar Feller (Note: Also known as Richard Robert Feller.) (20 December 1899 – 23 December 1958) served in the Royal Air Force in the First World War, Married Mary L. Rogers in Hambledon, Surrey, England in the first quarter of 1932, and was recorded as an off-licence manager in the 1939 register. His youngest sister Louisa was his executrix.
- Louis Sigried Feller (17 October 1902 – ), a master tailor, shared housing with his sister Christina throughout the 1930s. Served as his mother's executor.
- Christina Louisa Feller (14 June 1908 – ), a book-keeper and shorthand-typist, was born after the death of her father. Executrix for her brother Robert Rudolf in 1958 – 1959. The electoral registers show her sharing different houses with her brother Louis Sigfried during the 1930s.

By 1891 Feller was living at Hazeldene, Knight's Park, Kingston-on-Thames, and described himself as an Artist: Military Painter. He had moved again by 1895, this time to 13 Fitzroy Street. He again moved to 3 Charleville Road, Fulham, London by 1901. He and Christina now had six children. Christina was now operating a millinery and employing others in her enterprise.

== Feller's body of work ==
Feller's work can be divided up into a number of categories:

- Magazine illustration
- Military paintings
- Book illustration
- Postcards

These categories are not clearly defined and even overlap. Thus many of the magazines illustration and the postcards show military scenes. Book illustration and magazine illustration are not that far apart. However, it is still a useful scheme for looking closely at his body of work.

== Magazine illustration ==
Feller was a contribution to many magazines including:

- The Badminton Magazine
- Black and White. Thorpe described Feller as a regular but somewhat conventional contributor.
- The Boy's Own Paper
- The Captain
- The Christian Globe
- Chums
- Good Words
- The Idler
- The Illustrated Sporting and Dramatic News
- The New Budget
- The Pall Mall Magazine
- Pearson's Magazine
- Shurey's Illustrated. Feller was one of the principal illustrators. (Note: Initially provided extensive coverage of the Second Anglo-Boer War, before broadening to other topics. Ran from 14 October 1899 – 17 June 1903, and was then incorporated with Sketchy Bits.)
- Shurey's Pictorial Budget. Feller was one of the principal illustrators. (Note: Also dedicated to coverage of the Second Anglo-Boer War. Illustrations and captions only, no separate text. Twelve issues only. Ran from 10 February 1900 – 7 May 1900. Incorporated with Shurey's Illustrated.)
- Society
- The Sphere
- St Paul's Magazine Thorne referred to some of Feller's double page war drawings as indifferent.
- The Strand Magazine

=== Example of magazine illustration ===
The July 1894 edition of The Strand Magazine contained an article called Marksmanship by Gilber Guerdon. The eleven page article had twenty illustrations, ten of which are shown here. (Note: Four of the twenty illustrations were not signed by Feller, it is not clear if they are simply not signed, or represent the use of clip art (previously used illustrations) by The Strand.) The magazine used good quality paper, so there was no signs of the problems that plagued some of Feller's book illustrations for G. A. Henty, even though the illustrations were wash drawings rather than just pen and ink. Feller's hologram is used to sign the illustration of William Tell, where on the top half is visible, and on the skirts of the woman running the Coconut Shy, where it is clearly visible. The other illustrations bear his name in full.

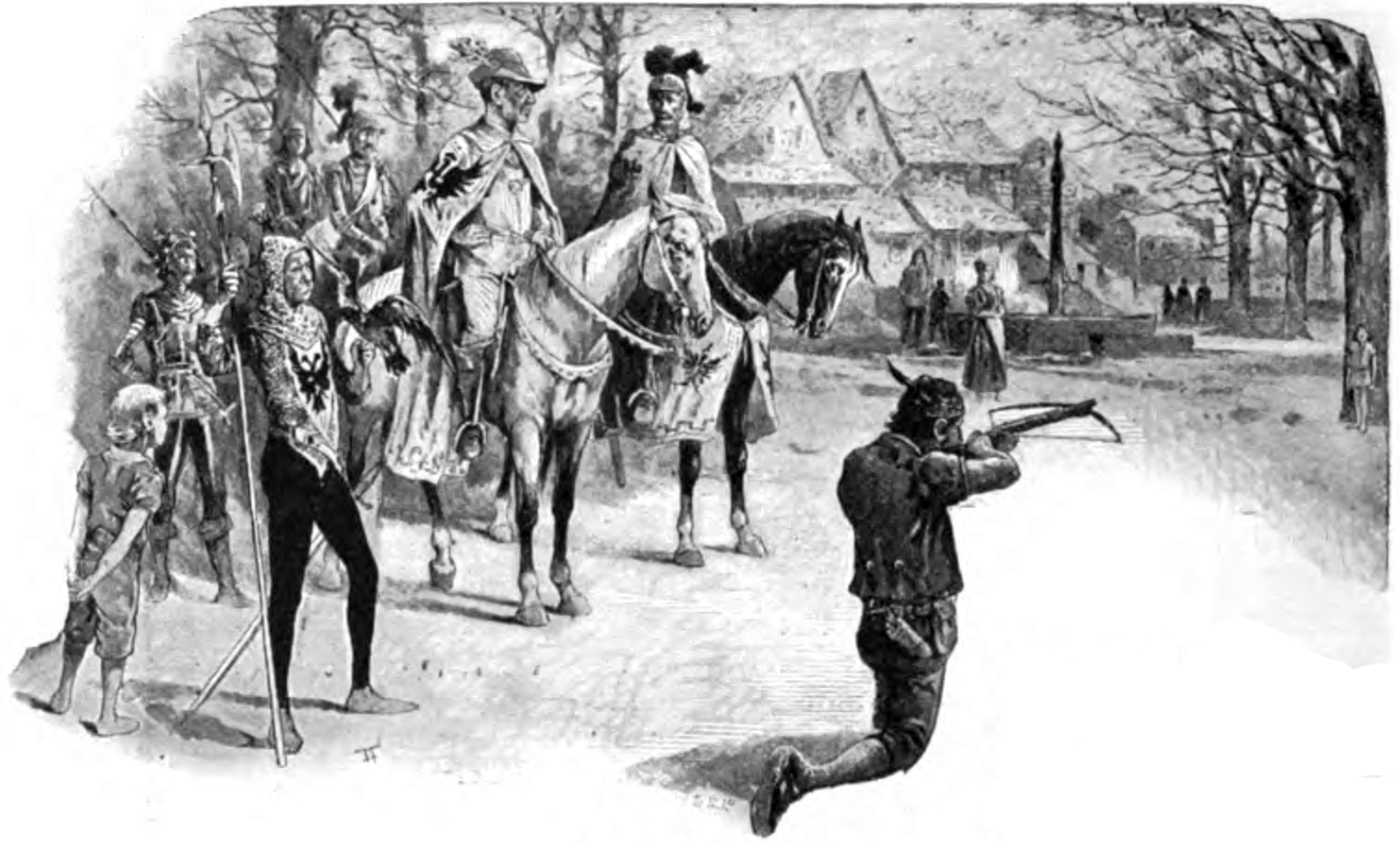
William Tell

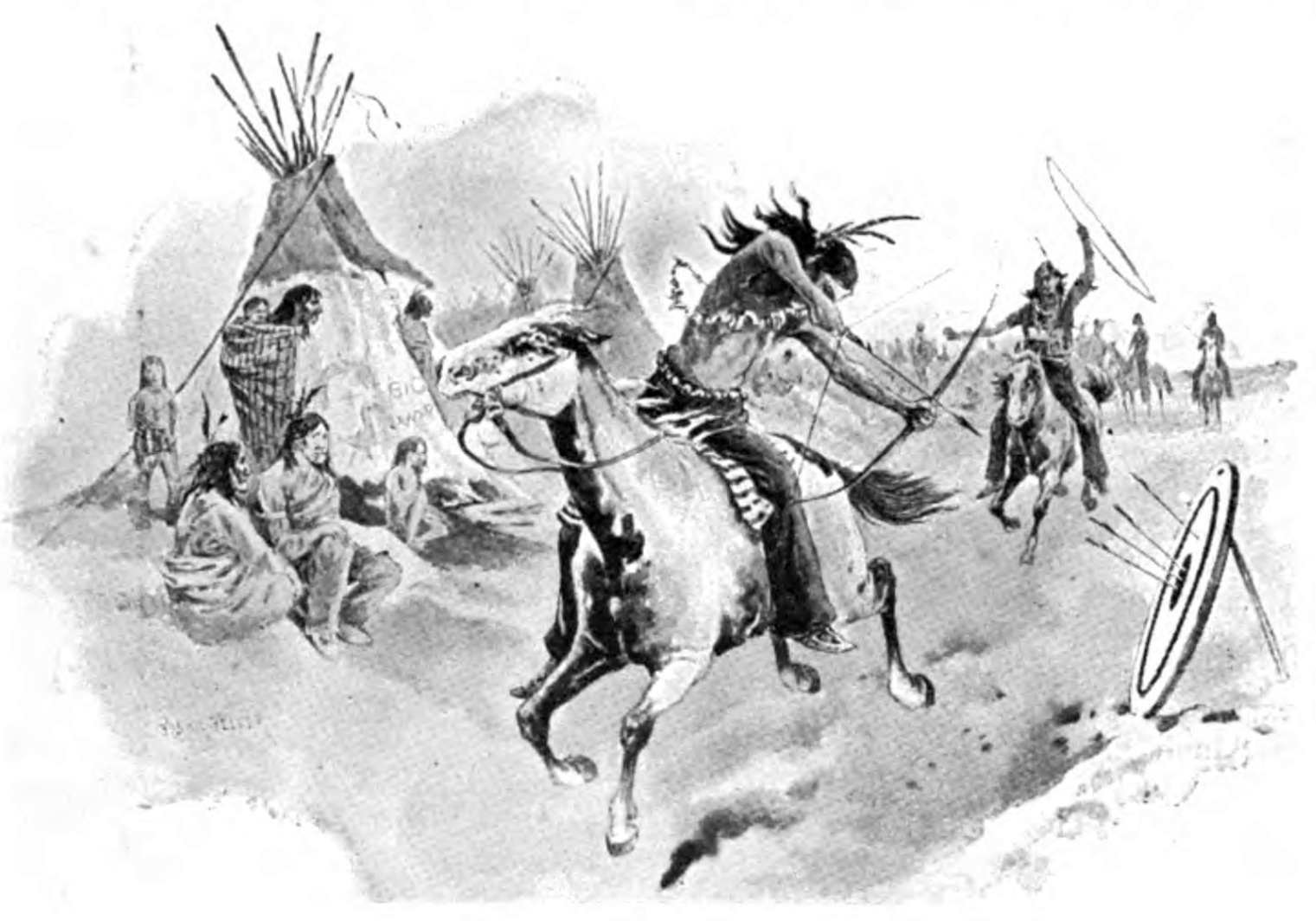
Indian Archers

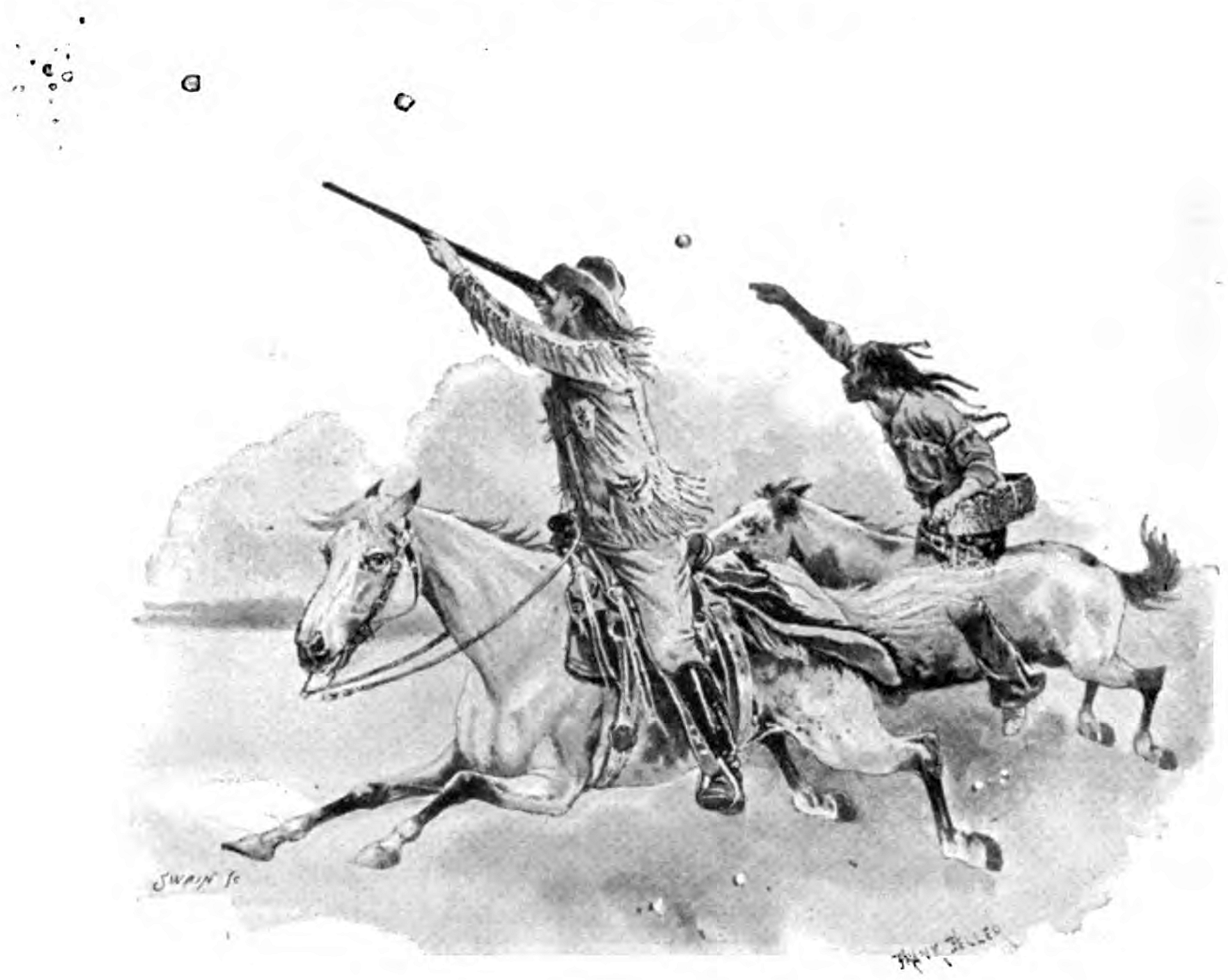
Buffalo Bill Shooting at Glass Balls

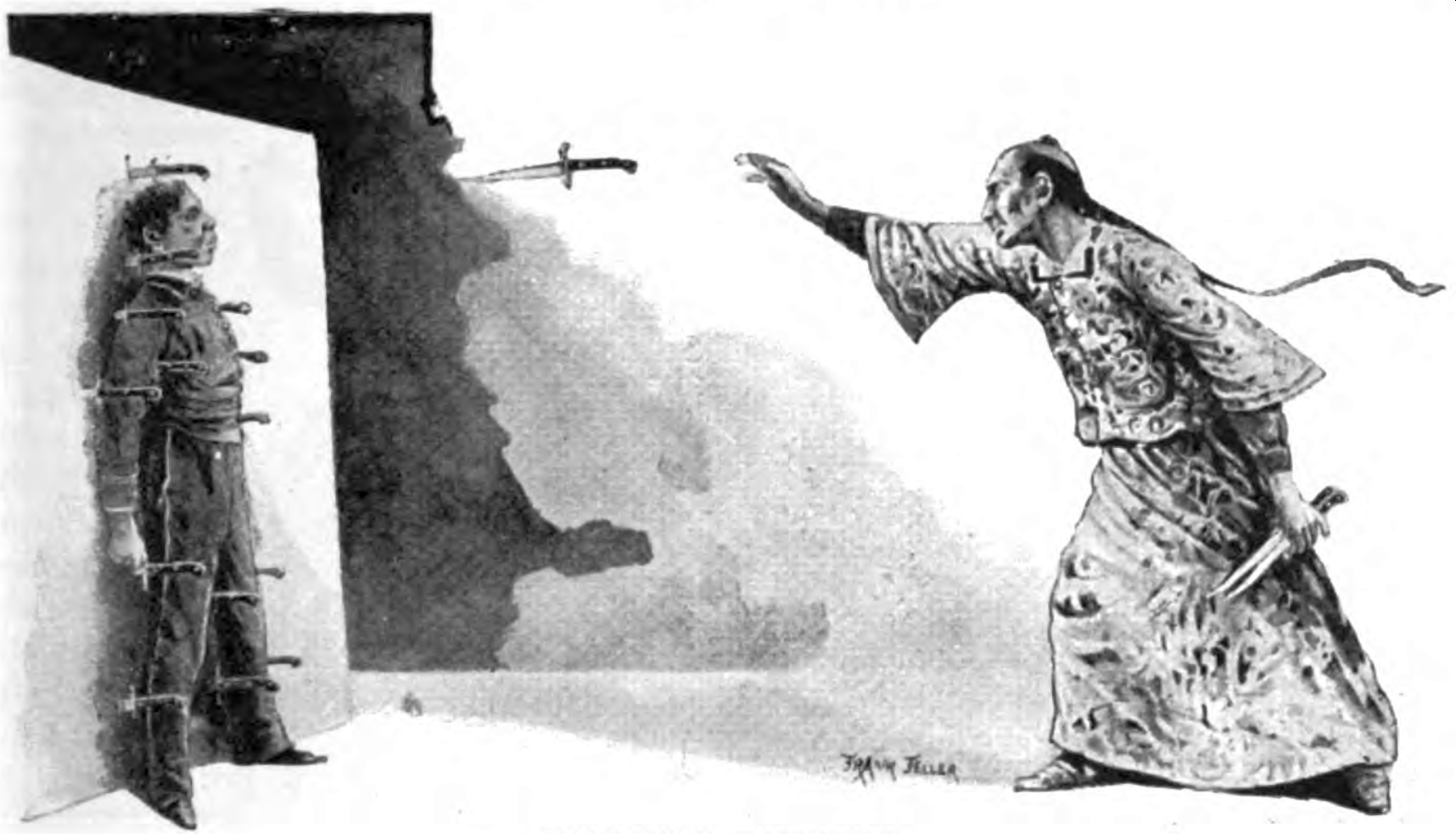
The Chinese knife trick

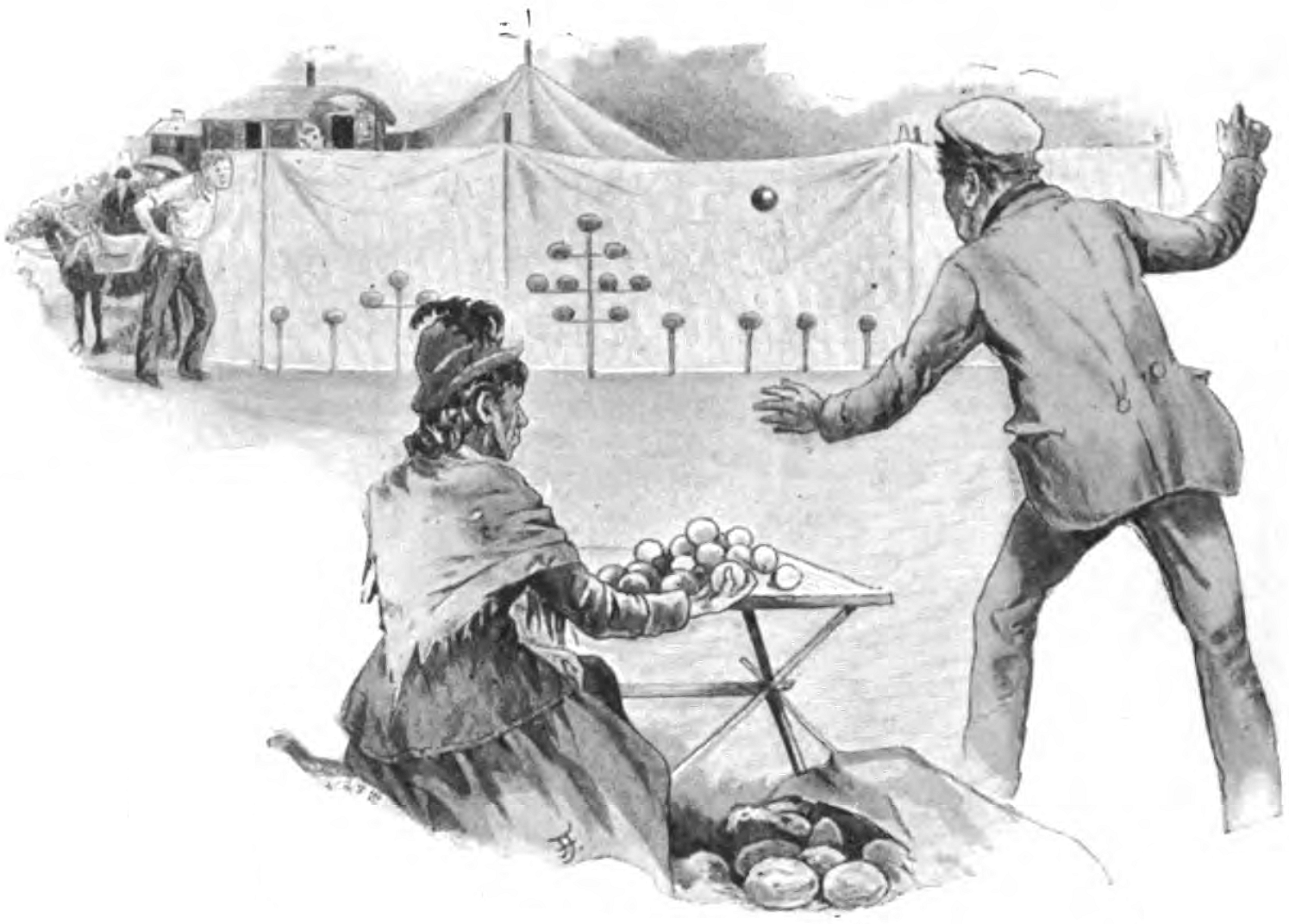
Dead on the Cocoa-nuts

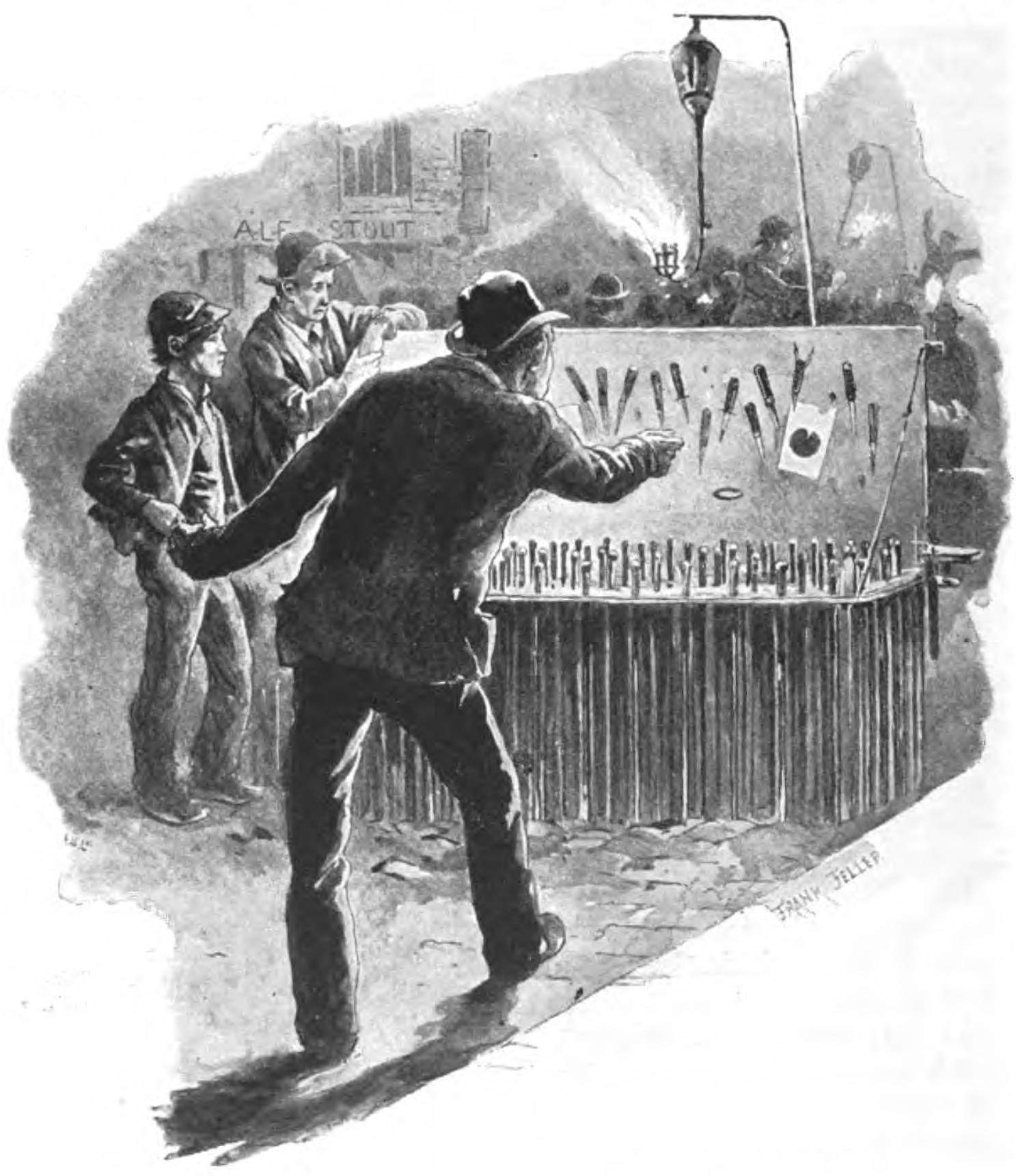
Six Shies a Penny

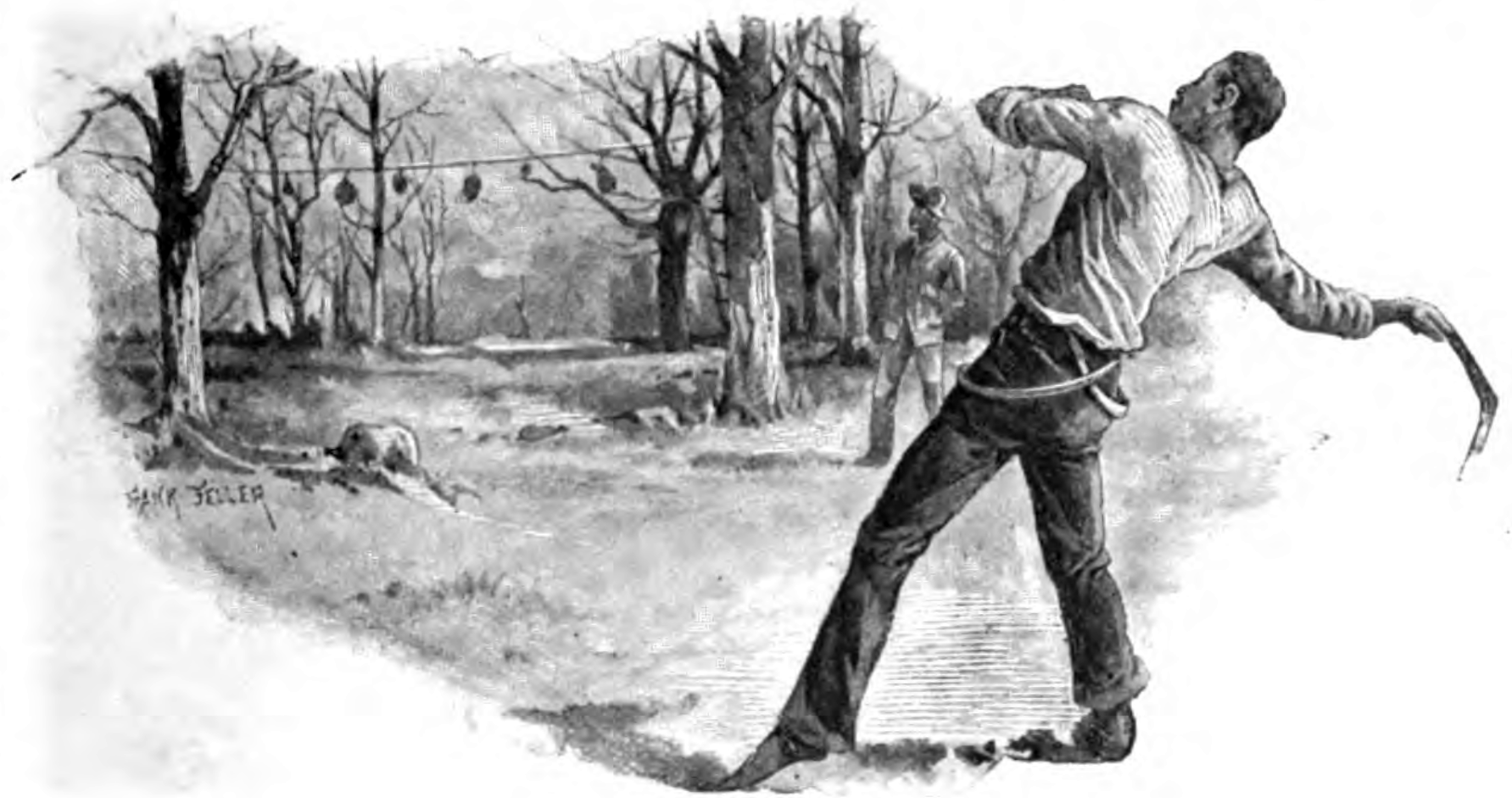
Australian Boomerang

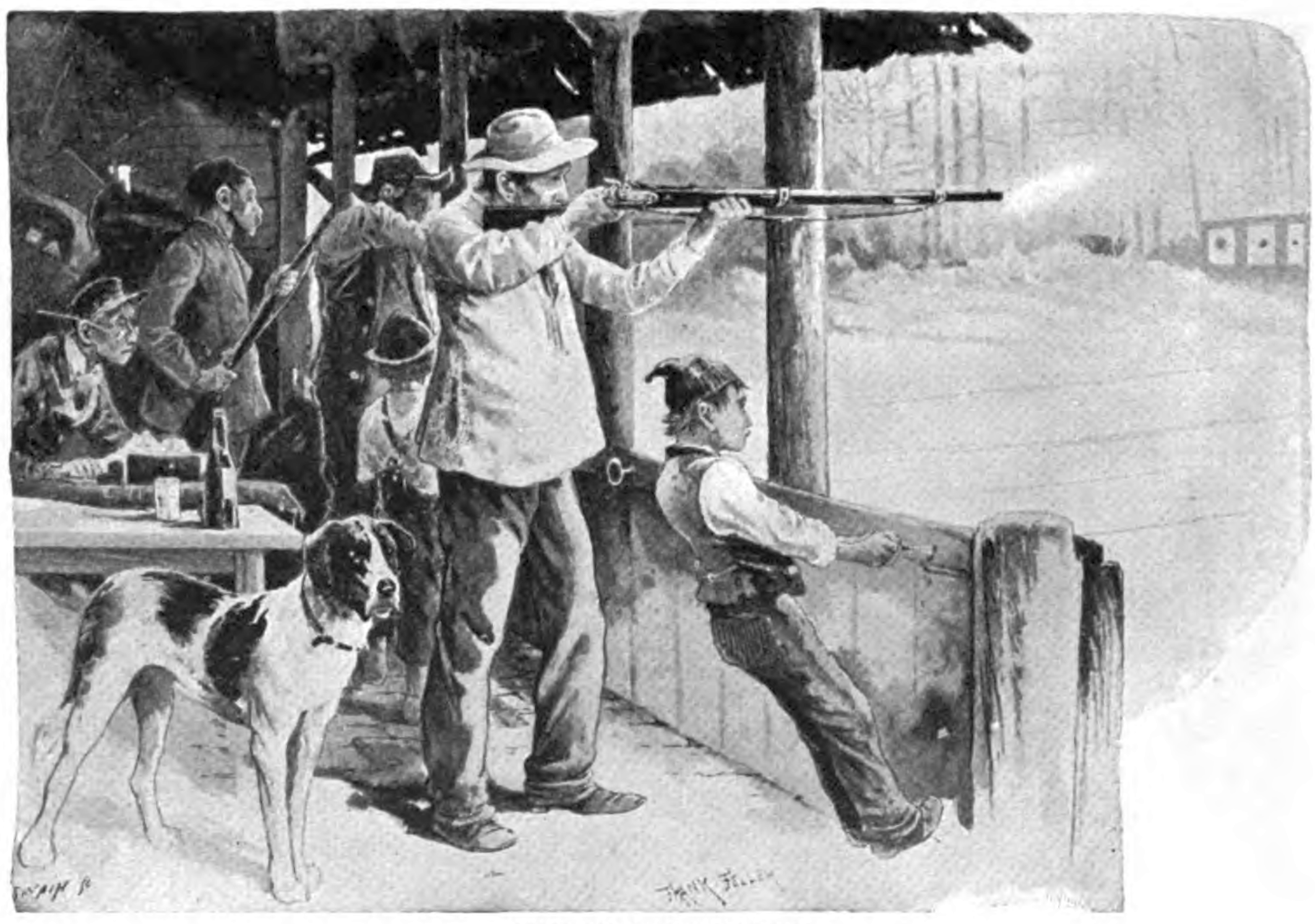
Swiss Shooting for Prizes

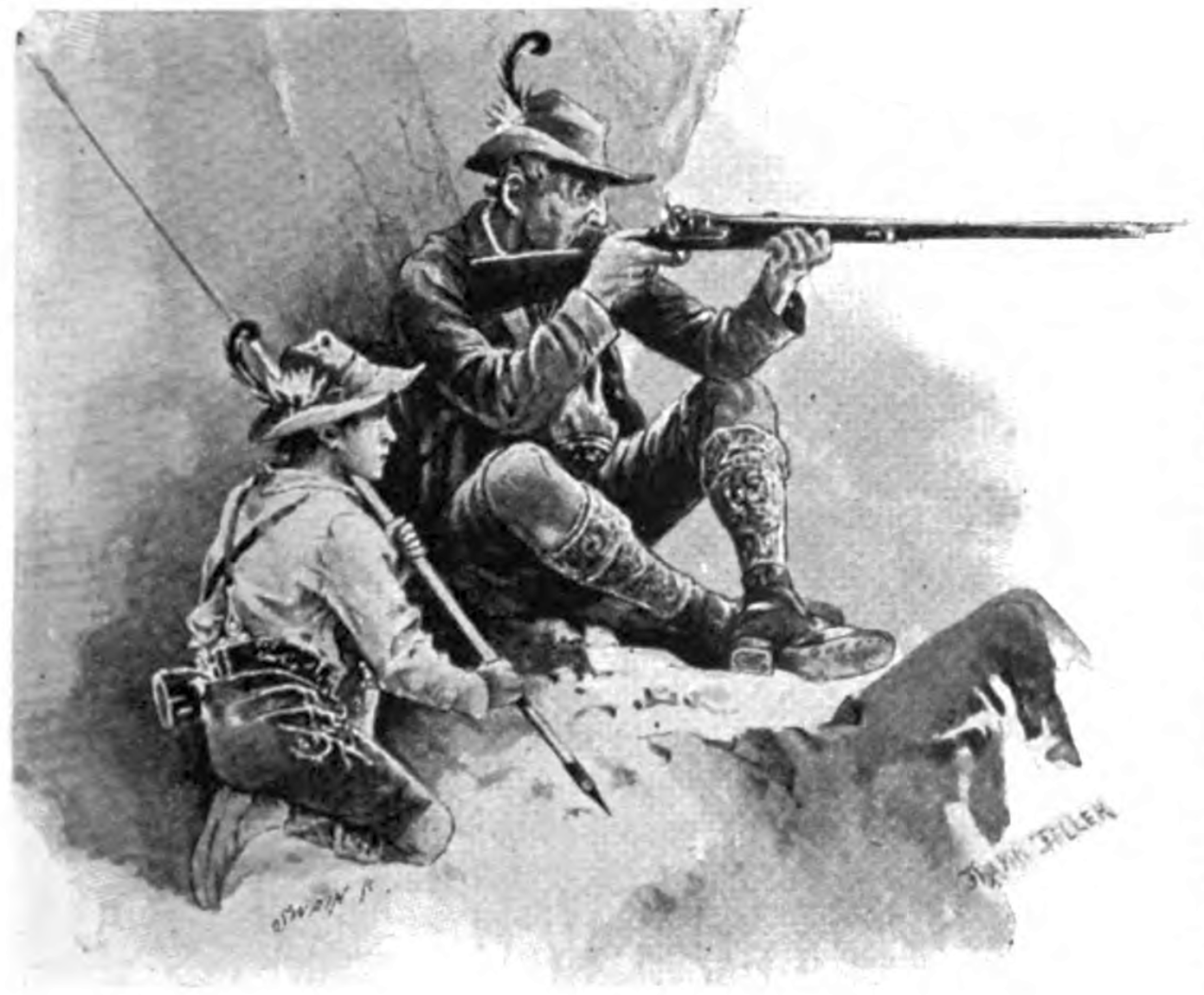
Tyrolese Marksman

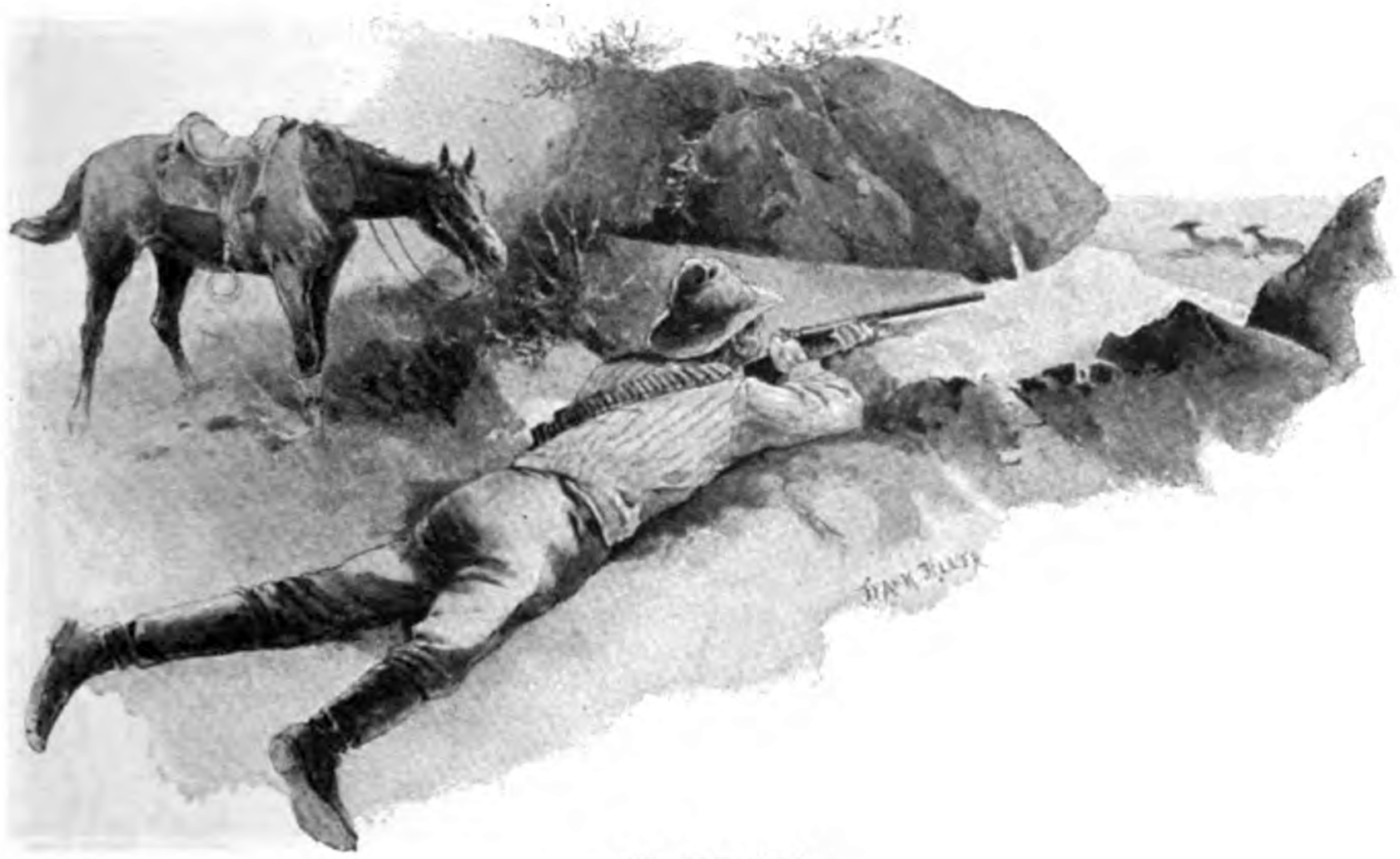
Boer Sportsman

== Military paintings ==
Painting and drawing military scenes was one of the mainstays of Fellers's work, and The Sphere captioned his photograph The Military Artist in its coverage of his death. In its obituary, The Boy's Own Paper stated that he would be most remembered for:

- The Midnight Charge of Kassassin from the Anglo-Egyptian War of July to September 1882.
- The Last Eleven at Maiwand from the Second Anglo-Afghan War of 1878 – 1880.
- The Last Grip which shows a British officer, revolver in hand, holding the hand of a dying comrade who is lying on his dead horse in the desert, as three mounted Arabs rush towards him. It appeared as colour reproduction in the 1894 Christmas Number of Black and White.
- A Stampede, based on an incident in the Second Anglo-Boer War
- Custer's Last Charge, from the Battle of the Little Bighorn 25–26 June 1876.
- The Old Flag, an imaginary incident in the Second Anglo-Boer War on which Lord Roberts, accompanied by all the Generals, received the plaudits of a representative detachment of the British Army."
- No Surrender, was not a painting that the Boy's Own Paper listed, but it is the only one of his painting currently in public collections in the UK. This shows the aftermath of the Battle of Magersfontein (11 December 1899) in the Second Anglo-Boer War where the Highland Brigade was ordered to attack a Boer position without any worthwhile prior reconnaissance.

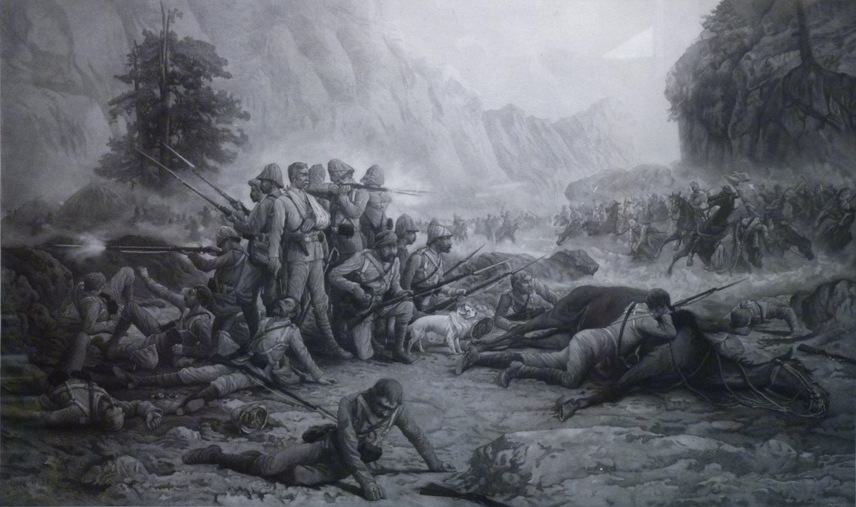
The Last Eleven at Maiwand by Frank Feller

In 1882 Feller completed what is probably his most famous work, The Last Eleven at Maiwand. It depicted the last eleven men from the 66th (Berkshire) Regiment of Foot with their regimental mascot, "Bobby", making a last stand as Afghan horseman approach. (Note: "Bobby", the only survivor of the regiment, was wounded during the battle, but made his way to Kandahar and rejoined his old corps. Queen Victoria personally placed a medal ribbon around his neck. However, a dignified old age was not to be his, as within a year he was run-over by a cart and killed in the Isle of Wight.) The original painting has disappeared, (Note: A sketch 350 x 300 cm is in the Duke of Edinburgh's Royal Regiment Museum at Salisbury) but is known from the print published by Henry Graves in April 1884. The painting was unusual in that it was a watercolour of seven feet (over two metres) in length. The painting received a lot of favourable critical attention:

- . . . executed with all the vigour and realism so necessary in a battle-picture. – The Daily News
- . . . has evidently special special capacity for dealing with battle scenes, as well as great skill with his pencil. – Hampshire Advertiser
- Never was any artist more worthy of recognition than he . . . – Perthshire Constitutional
- The figures . . . are well drawn na effectively grouped. They are life-like in action . . . – The Morning Post

However Beckett considers the painting to be less skilled than Richard Caton Woodville's Saving the guns at Maiwand.

After his success with The last eleven Feller exhibited at the Royal Academy with:

- Outpost (1883)
- Bushey Park (1887)
- Faithful to the last (1895)

== Book illustration ==
1881 was also when he did his first book illustrations. These were for Gipsy Mike or, Firm as a Rock published by John F. Shaw and Co., London, (Note: This is available online at the British Library) and G. A. Henty's Out on the Pampas. (Note: This was Henty's first children's book, and the heroes of the story bear the names of his own children) While the illustrations for Gipsy Mike were pen and ink drawings, those for Out on the Pampas were wash-drawings. Unfortunately these drawings . . . were poorly reproduced by halftone blocks made with too fine a screen for the paper they were printed on." Feller was one of two illustrators whose work for Henty suffered the most from being printed on paper that was too low a quality for the fineness of halftone blocks used. (Note: The other was Johann Schönberg (1844 – 2 December 1913), a military artist who had been born in Austria, and like Feller, settled in London.)

No complete list of books illustrated by Feller is available. Even comprehensive catalogues such as the Jisc Library Hub Discover (Note: The Jisc Library Hub Discover brings together the catalogues of 165 Major UK and Irish libraries. Additional libraries are being added all the time, and the catalogue collates national, university, and research libraries.) have gaps as the names of illustrators are not always recorded when cataloguing even where the publishers provide that information. (Note: For example, in the specific case of Gipsy Mike there is no identification of the illustrator on the title page, and the British Library does not record Feller as being a contributor to the book.)

However by using Jisc, Abe Books, and newspaper archives, it is possible to build a partial list of authors whose work was illustrated by Feller. These include:

- Phoebe Allen (1858–1933), a prolific English writer who wrote novels, juvenile fiction, and popular introductions to a range of topics.
- James Francis Cobb (1829–1903), an English banker and author, mainly of historical juvenile fiction.
- Oswald Crawfurd (1834–1909), an English journalist, author, diplomat and editor, who managed publisher Chapman & Hall, and edited Black and White.
- A. Eubule Evans (1839–1896), an Anglican cleric and popular novelist, including tract novels for the SPCK.
- V. L. Going, who wrote at least one work of juvenile fiction set in the Greco-Turkish War (1897), a contributor to Captain and The Boy's Own Paper.
- Margaret Scott Haycraft (1855–1936), a prolific English author whose audience ranged from the very young to strong moral tales.
- G. A. Henty (1832–1902), a prolific writer of boy's adventure fiction, often set in a historical context, who had himself served in the military and been a war correspondent.
- John C. Hutcheson (1840–1897), a British writer about life at sea.
- Arthur Lee Knight, an author of nautical and historical juvenile fiction and a contributor to the Boy's Own Paper. Active from the 1880s to the 1920s.
- Hugh St. Leger, an English journalist, and author of juvenile fiction, who served both in the Navy and the Army, and drew on his experiences in his books.
- Donald McIntyre (1831–1903), a British general in India, and holder of the Victoria Cross who was active on the frontier with Afghanistan and in suppressing the Indian Mutiny. Wrote one book about wandering and wild-sport beyond the Himalayas.
- Lewis Novra (1838–1892), an English poet and song-writer who lived at 95 Regent Street, London.
- Bertie Senior, wrote at least one work of juvenile fiction about a treasure hunt.
- Noel West, pseudonym of Mrs. M. B. Cox, who wrote juvenile fiction.
- Frederick Whishaw (1854–1934), a Russian-born British historian, poet, musician, and author of juvenile fiction.

=== Example of book illustration by Frank Feller ===
The following example of book illustration by Frank Feller is from one of the first books he illustrated Gipsy Mike; or, Firm as a Rock. (1881) by an anonymous author. It was published by J. F. Shaw & Co. Illustrations by courtesy of the British Library. These illustrations look static when compared with Feller's later work.

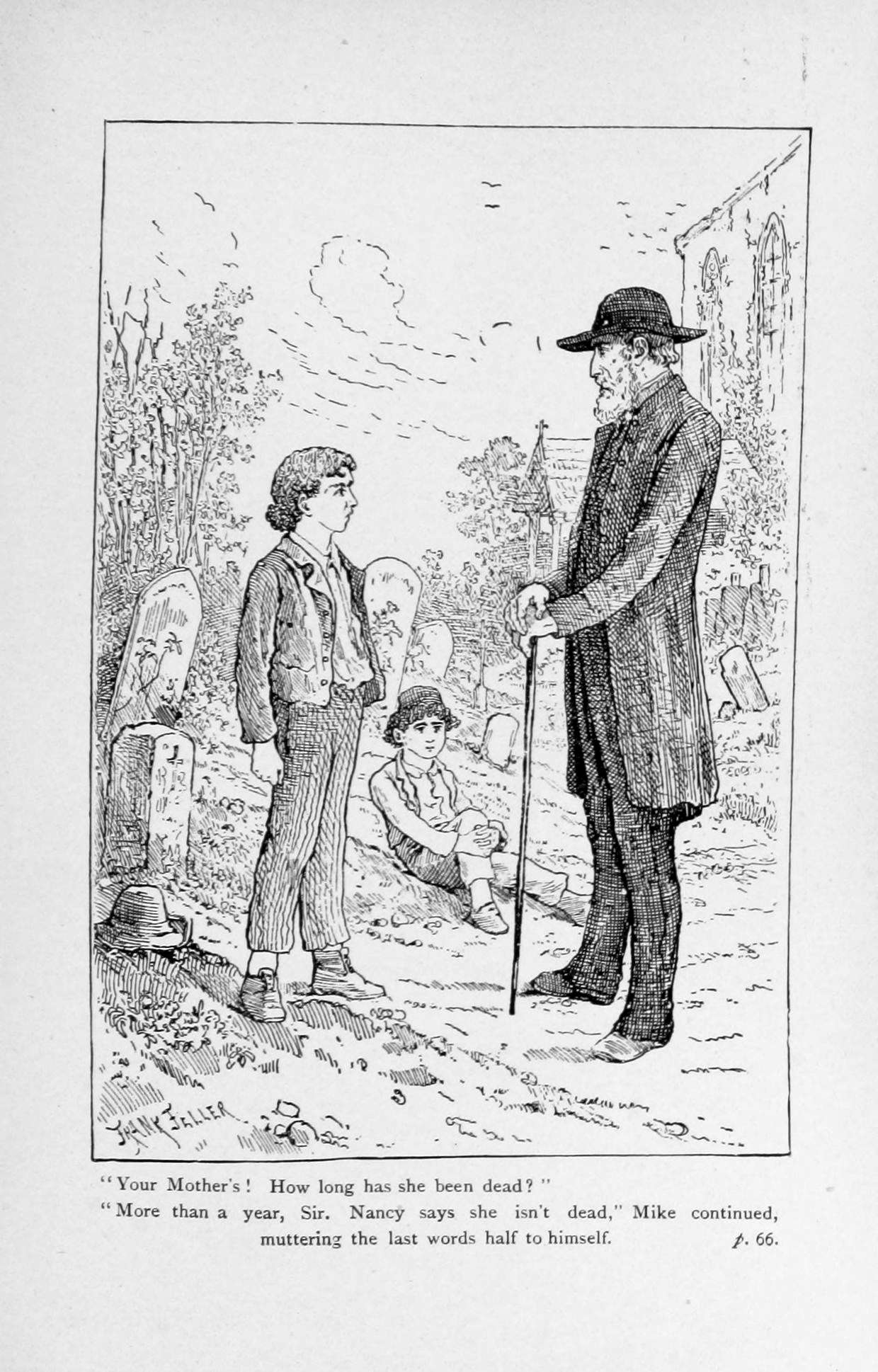
Page 066

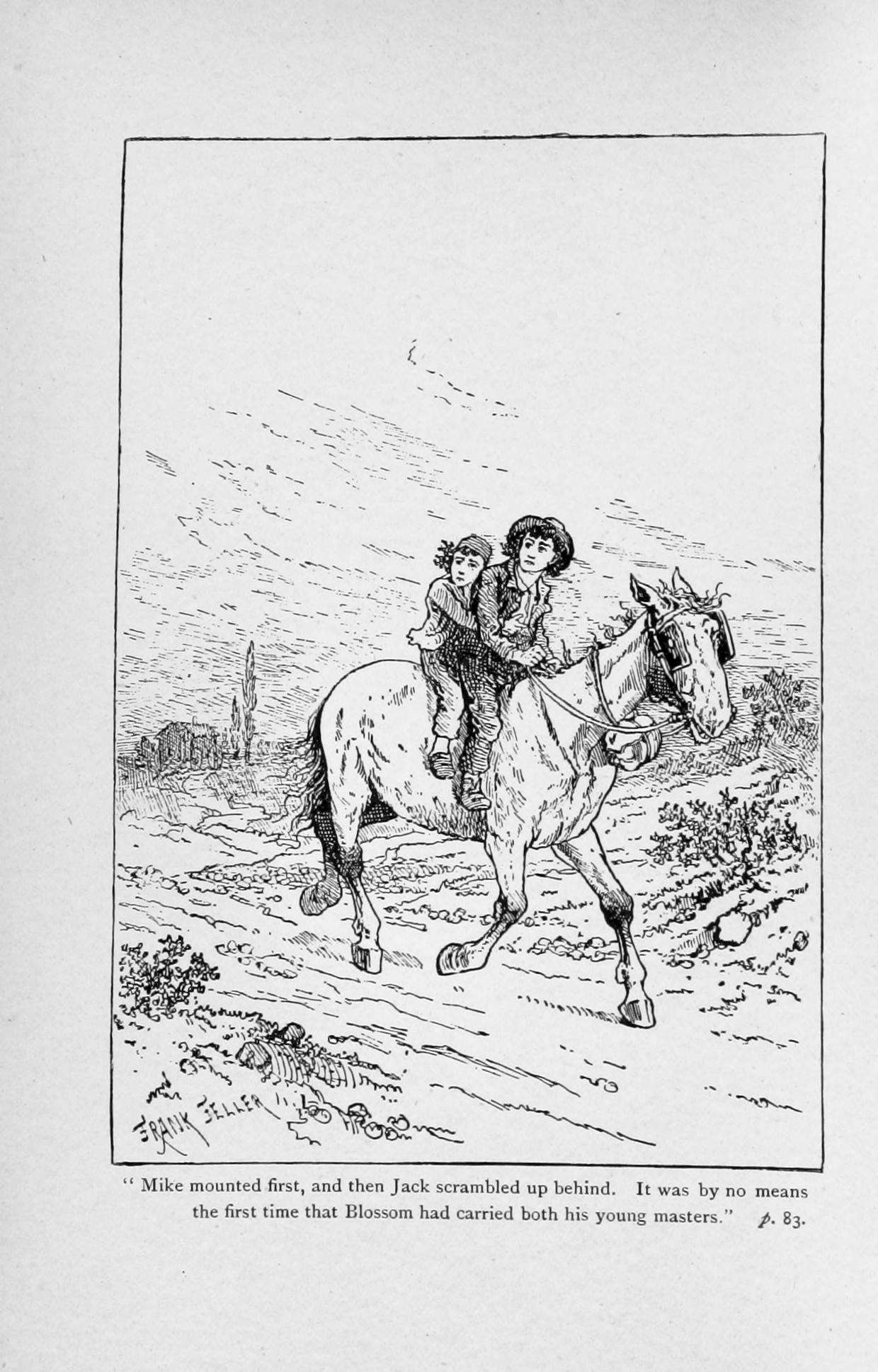
Page 083

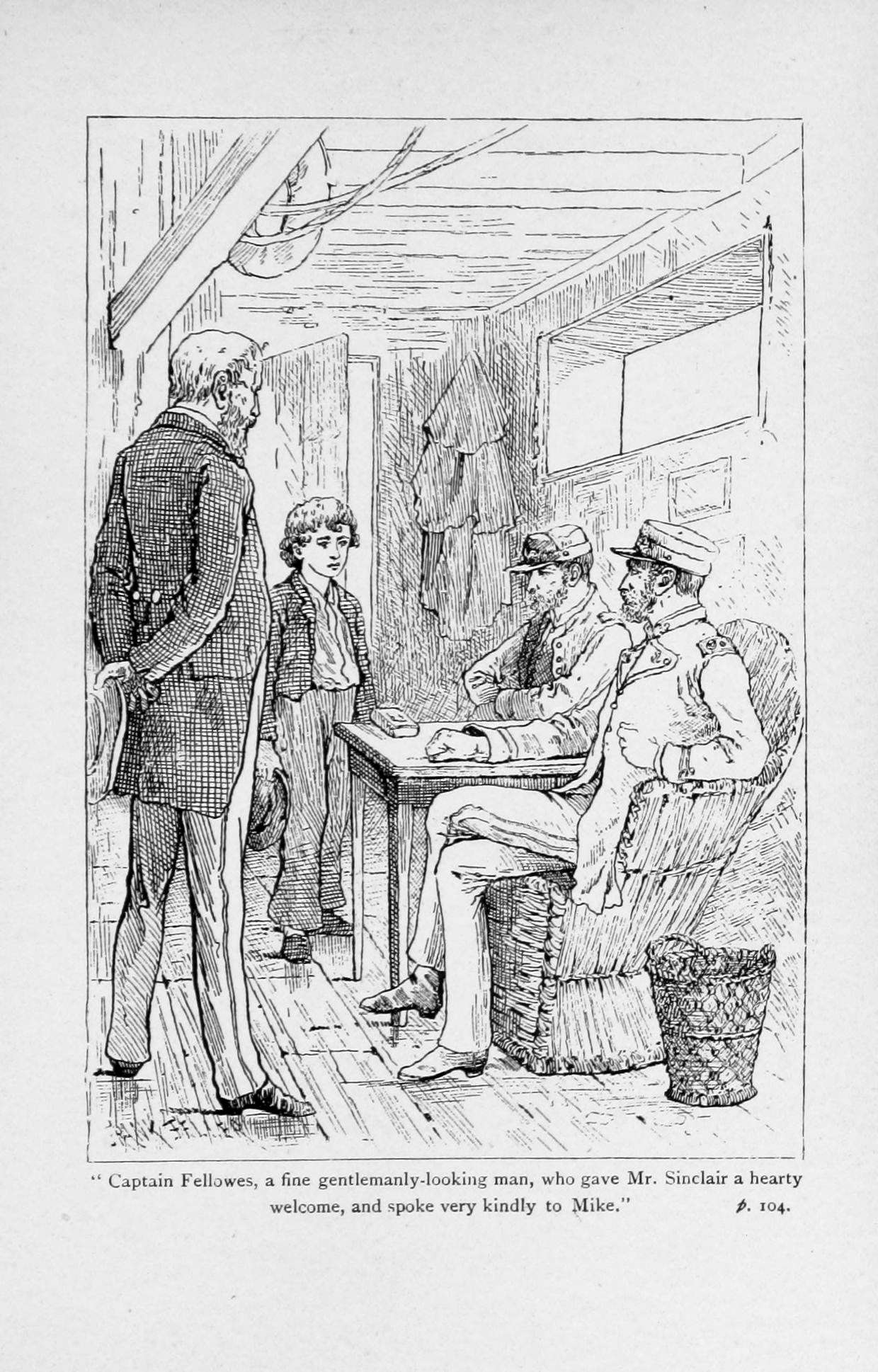
Page 104

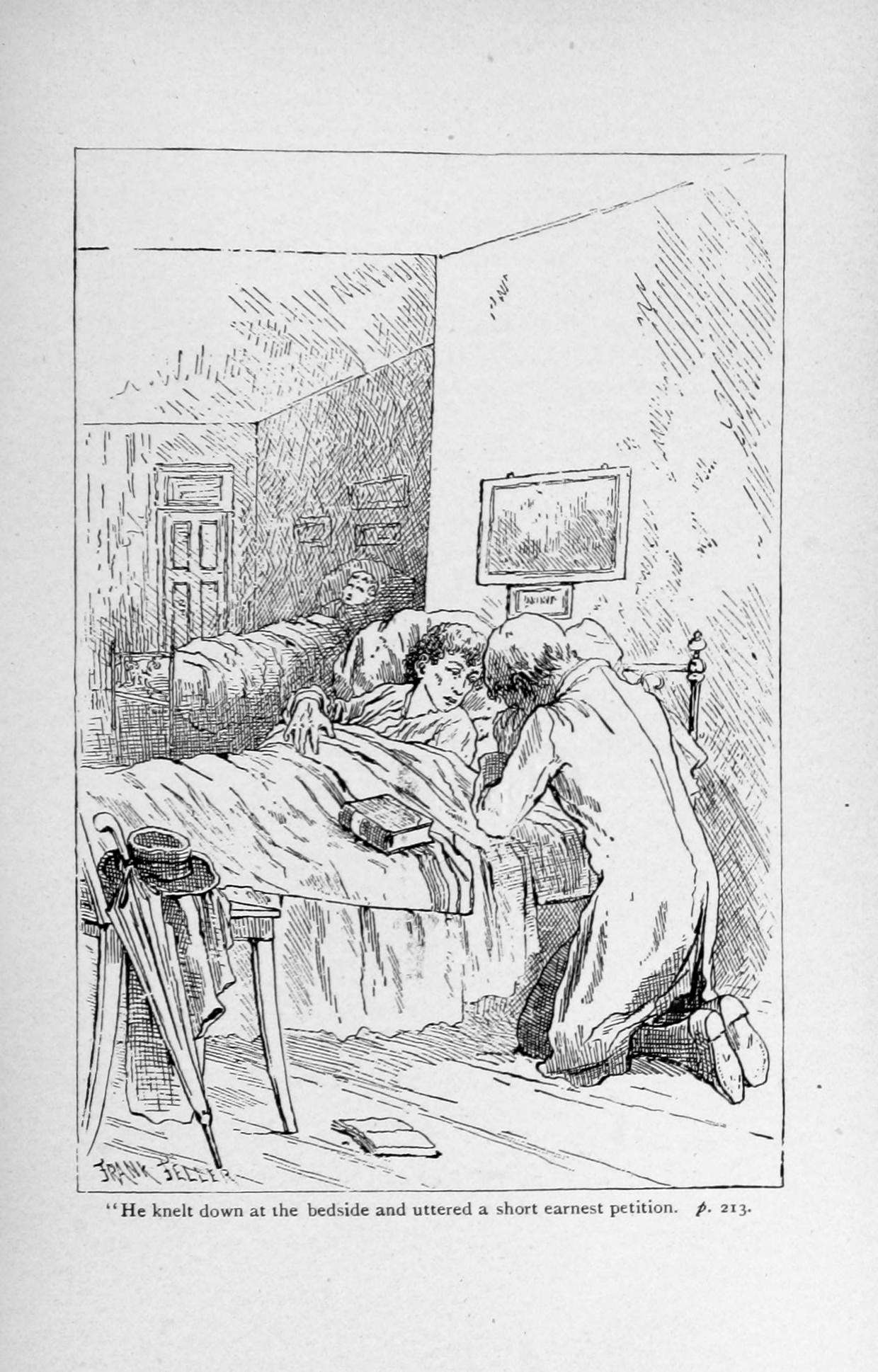
Page 213

== Postcards ==
Feller was well known as a post card artist. His series of card designs for Eyre and Spottiswoode of Sportsmen, Sailors, and Policemen were one of the most popular cards for them in 1881.

Image searches, and the Tuck Database, show that Feller contributed to many different series of postcards including:

- Life in Russia (several series)
- Life in Spain
- In the Alps
- In the Tyrol
- Angling
- Life in China
- Life in Switzerland
- Cowboys and Indians
- Soldiers

Unfortunately Raphael Tuck & Sons, for whom Feller did a great deal of work, had their premises destroyed, together with 40,000 original drawings and all their records, on 29 December 1940, during The Blitz. This naturally limits the number of examples of Feller's work.

Feller also painted postcards for Hildesheimer and Faulkner. The Lancet considered that his 1885 Christmas Cards featuring mounted Hussars were very effective. The designs had been purchased by the company between November 1883 and November 1884 as it took five to nine months to lithograph and print each set of cards, and the cards had to be available early enough to allow people to send sets to relatives for this use.

=== Examples of postcards painted by Frank Feller ===
The following postcards were painted by Frank Feller for Raphael Tuck & Sons. The Olivine logo on the cards was one of Tuck's trademarks, and refers to the type of board used.

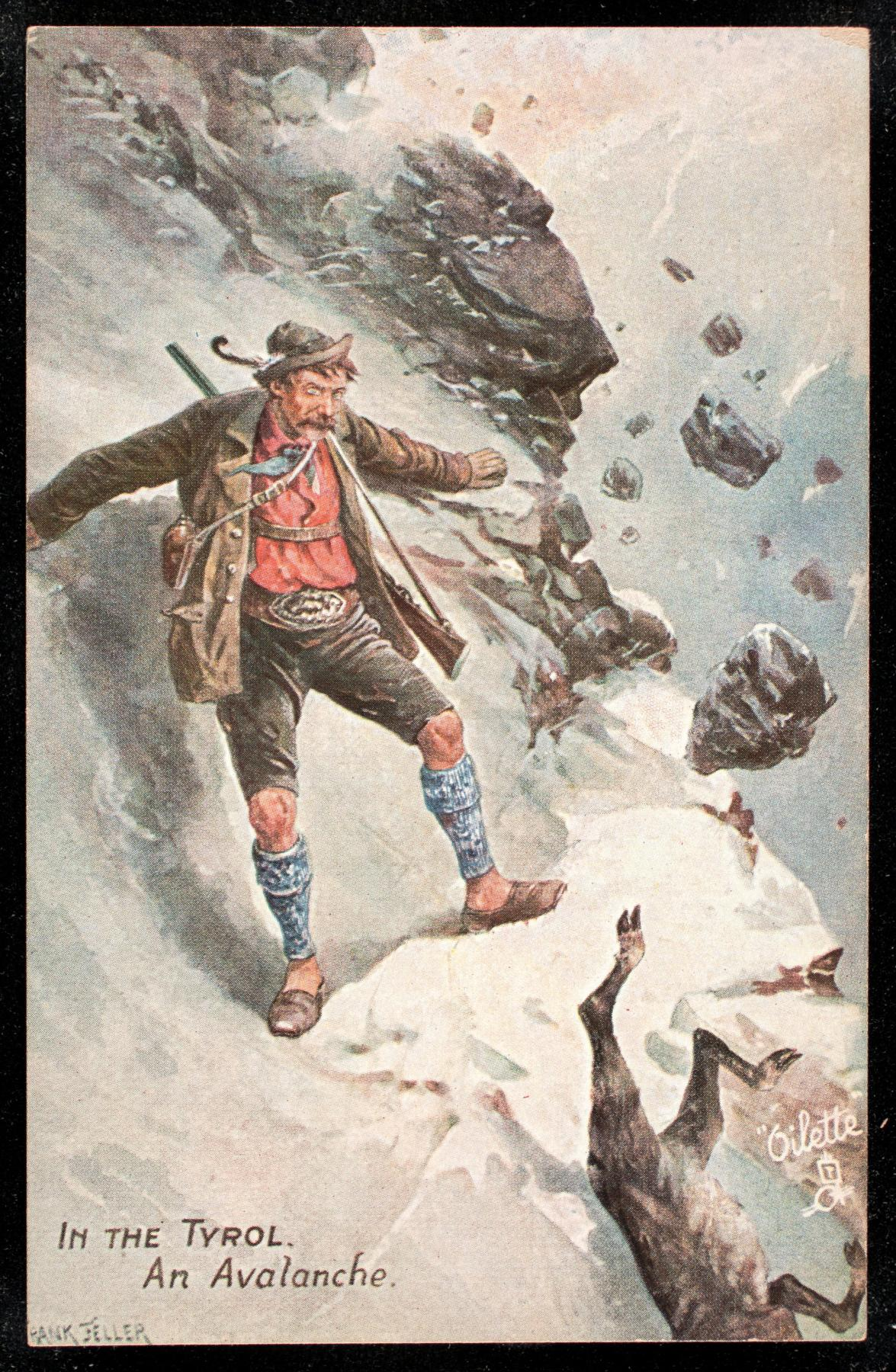
In the Tyrol, an Avalanche

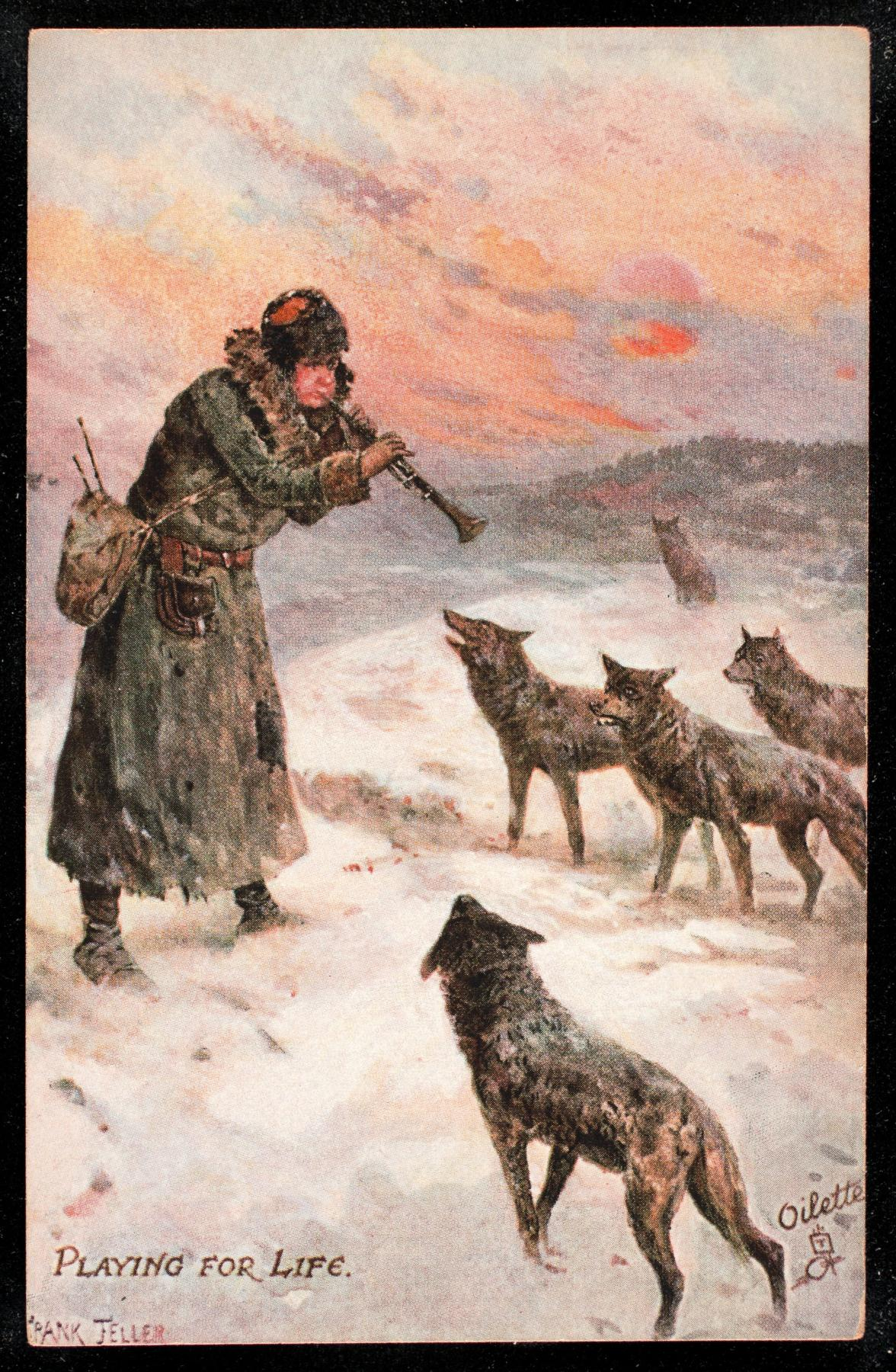
Playing for life

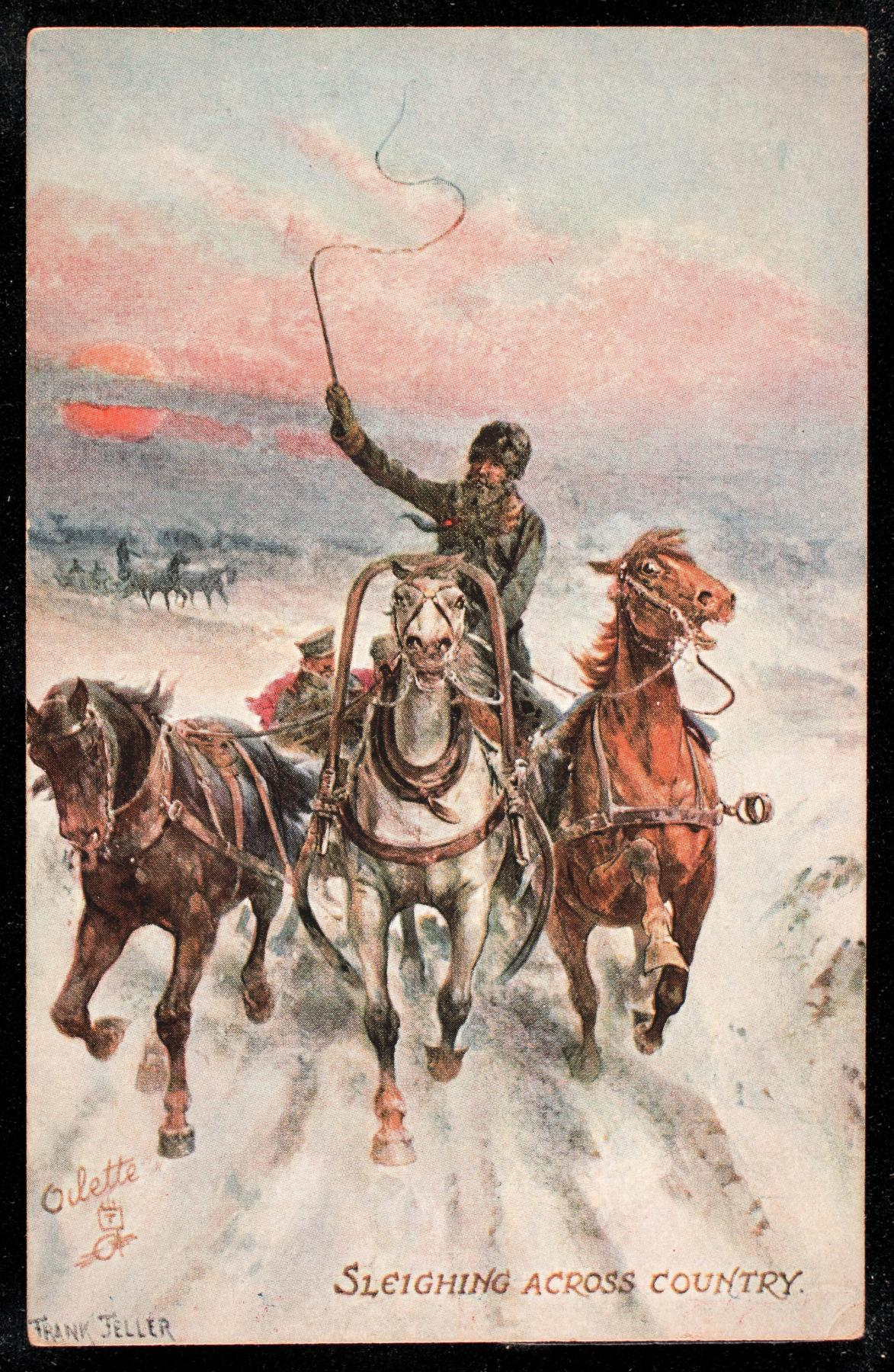
Sleighing across country

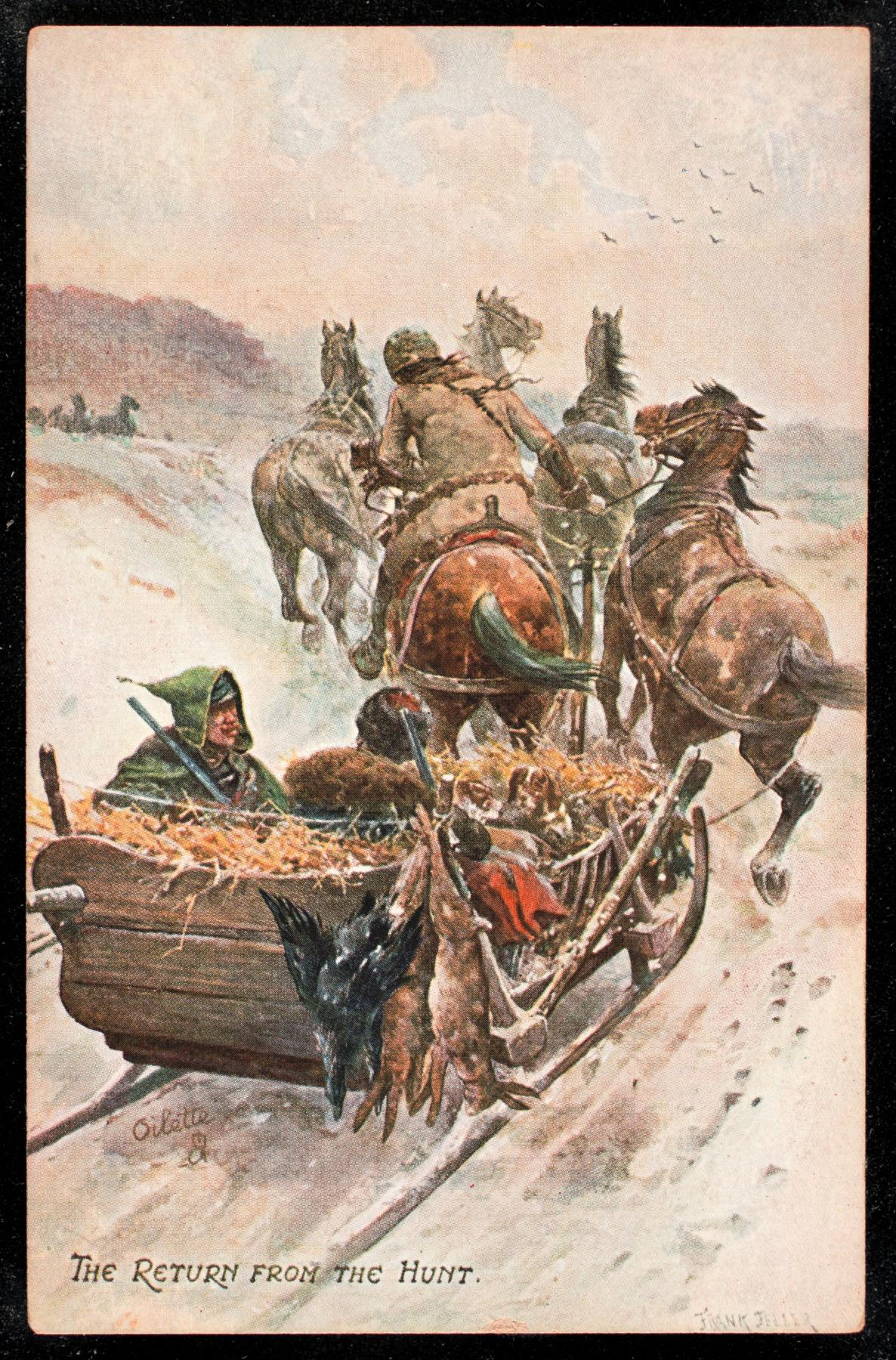
The Return from the Hunt

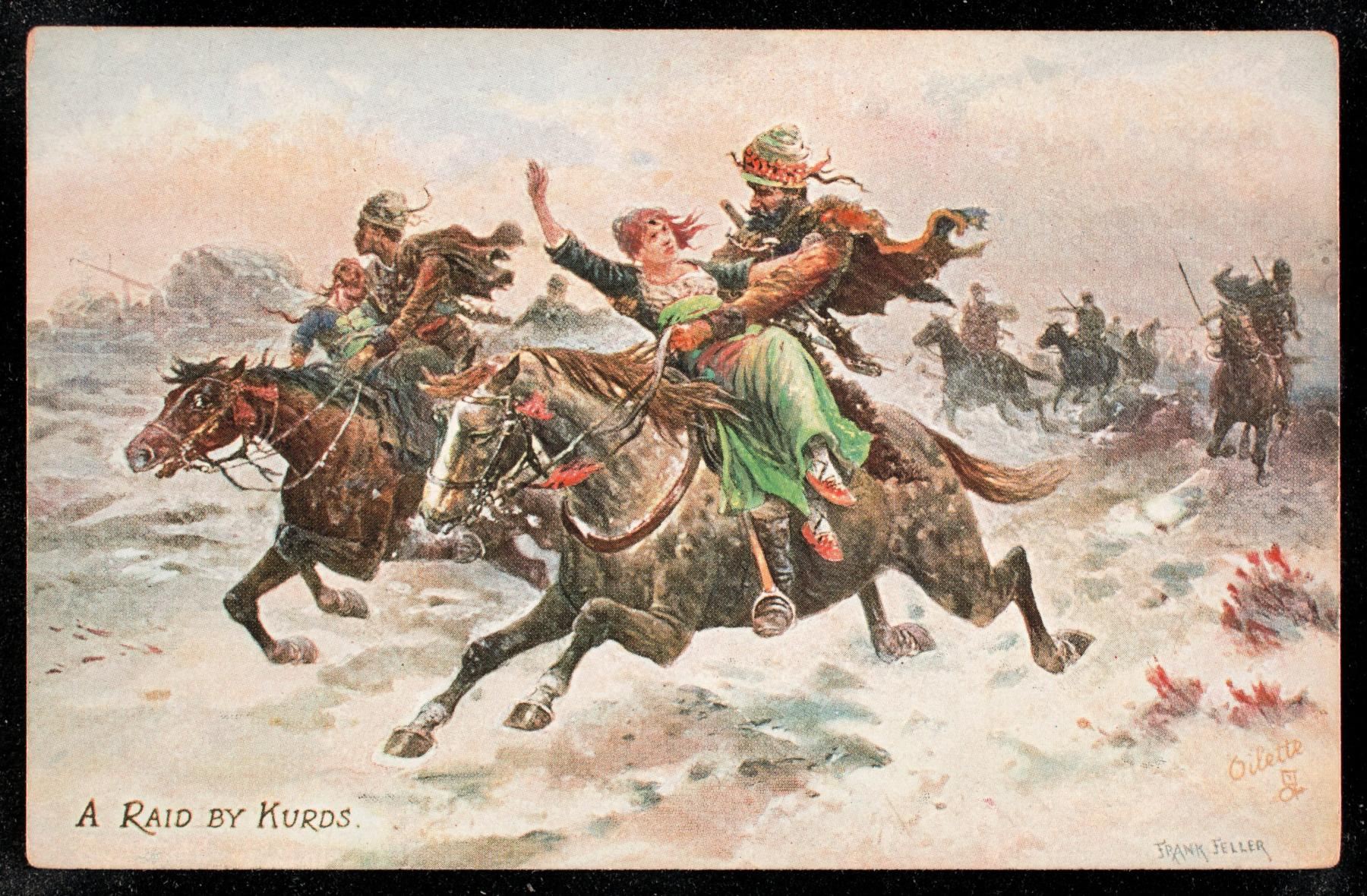
A raid by the Kurds

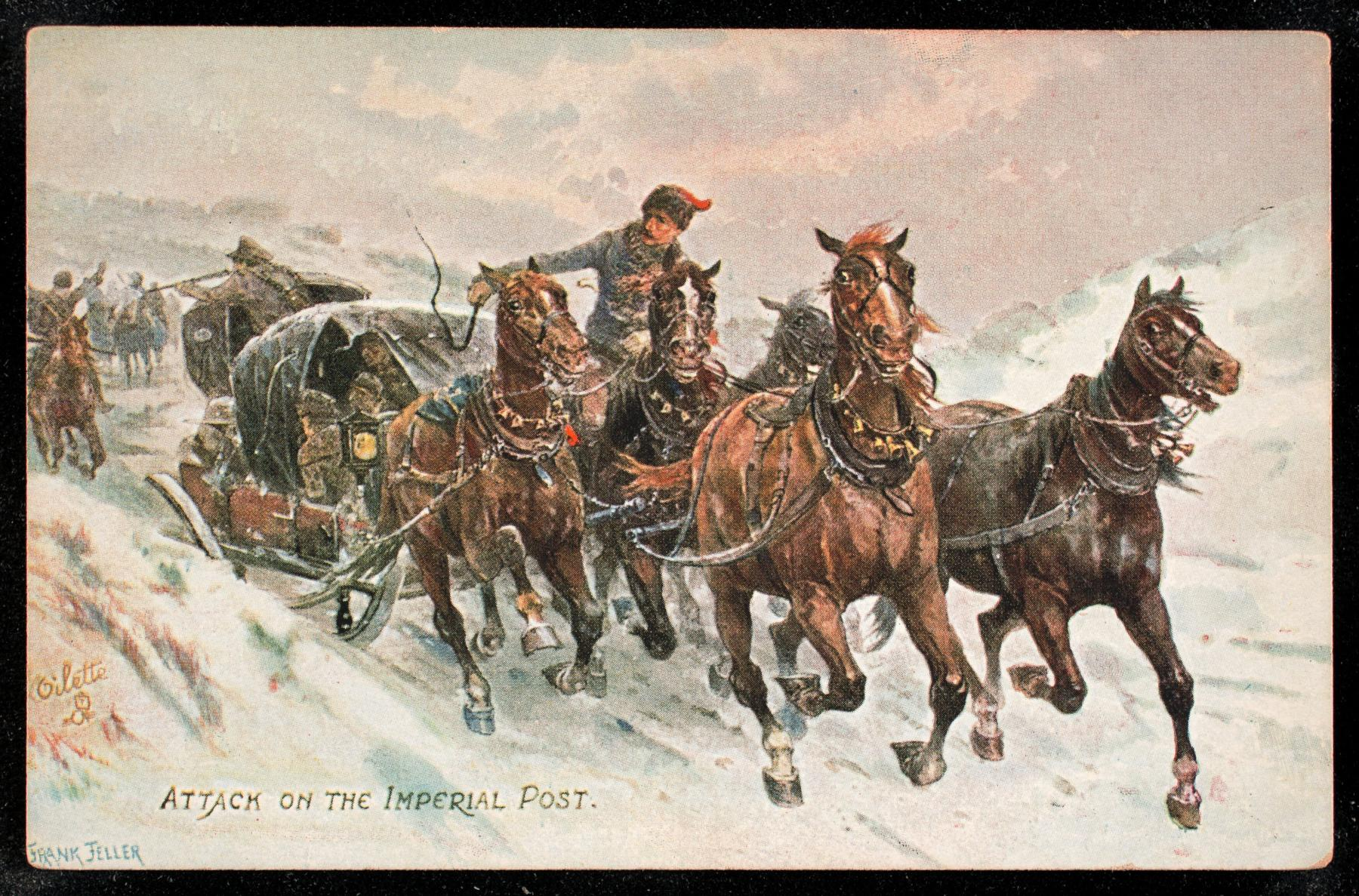
Attack on the Imperial Post

== Later life ==
Feller was living at 8 Wetherby Terrace, Earls Court, London, when he died from a heart attack on 6 March 1908. Both The Sphere and the Boys' Own Paper carried obituaries, the first of these with a photograph. His estate was valued at £500 7s. 6d. and his widow Christina was his executor. His widow was left looking after 5 minor children, the last of which, Louise, was born after the death of her father. By 1910, Christina was managing the Duke William of Cumberland public house (called the Duke William Hotel in the census returns) This had been her father's occupation. She remained there until at least 1914.

Christina married Sydney John South Allen at Brentford in the first quarter of 1913. She died at Willesden General Hospital on 15 June 1930. Her youngest son, Louis Siegfried, was her executor, for an estate valued at only £85 14s.
