= Ethel Nokes =

English author

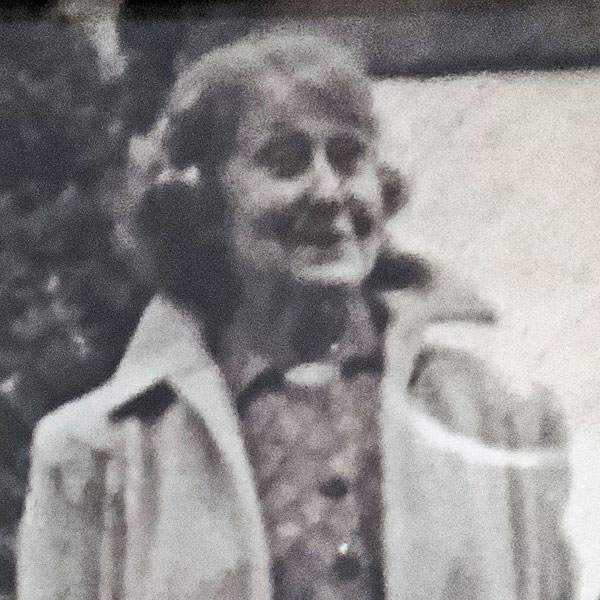
- Ethel Louise Nokes
- Born: Ethel Louise Yeo; 4 August 1883; Notting Hill, London, England
- Died: 28 November 1976 (aged 93); London, England
- Occupations: Teacher; novelist; poet
- Spouse: William Theodore Nokes (m. 1906; died 1942)
- Children: Muriel Ethel Nokes, William Frederick John Nokes
- Writing career
- Period: 1931–1969
- Genre: Children's literature
- Notable works: The Fourth Form Gang; The Fourth Form Gang Again; Sally of the Fourth Form Gang; Nibs: The Story of a Pony; Nibs in Clover: A Billy Bunker Story; That Ass Neddy; Winking Windows

Ethel Louise Nokes (1883–1976) was a British children's writer who produced 21 novels from the 1930s to the 1950s – several with equestrian themes, plus a trilogy of girls' school stories. Many of her works have evangelical sub-texts.

== Biography ==
Ethel was born and lived much of her life in London, England. She was brought up in the nonconformist Methodist religion and remained a life-long Methodist. She married William Theodore Nokes in 1906, and they had two children. Following the untimely death of first her daughter-in-law and then her son just three years later, she also took on full responsibility for bringing up her two grandchildren from 1954. Although her own husband died in 1942, Ethel lived into her 90s.

Many of Ethel's works have religious undertones and were published by the Religious Tract Society (RTS) – the nonconformist Christian publisher responsible for both the Boys' Own Paper and the Girls' Own Paper. (Note: RTS is now The Lutterworth Press.) Some books have The Girl's Own Paper (GOP) imprint, and later works were published by Ward, Lock & Co. Even when produced by the RTS/GOP the books are acknowledged to handle their piety with a light touch and gentle humour.

She taught children at a school in London, during which time she met and became friends with Enid Blyton, a fellow teacher, poet and children's author (some of whose books were also published by the Religious Tract Society and illustrated by the same illustrator, Stanley Lloyd). Blyton is believed to have been influential in Ethel Nokes' decision to start writing.

Ethel's girls' school stories have received praise from Sims & Clare, co-authors of The Encyclopaedia of Girls' School Stories. (Note: Sue Sims & Hilary Clare are the co-authors of The Encyclopaedia of Girls' School Stories, Volumes 1, 2 and 3, published by Girls Gone By Publishers, Somerset, United Kingdom') Many of the printing plates of Ethel's early works are understood to have been lost in a German bombing raid in London during the Second World War.

Ethel also wrote poetry, and a 20-page book of poems was published in 1969.

== Books ==
- Mary's Shining Light, etc., Religious Tract Society, London (1931)
- Grace Give-Away, Carey Press, London (1931)
- Old Brolly, Religious Tract Society, London (1932)
- Three Girls on Holiday, The Girl's Own Paper, London (1932)
- Down Green Crescent, etc. (colour frontispiece by Vernon Soper), Religious Tract Society, London (1932)
- Black Joe, etc., Religious Tract Society/Schomburg Children’s Collection, London (1932)
- Peter the Victor (illustrated by Clifford Lee), Religious Tract Society, London (1932)
- Twelve Help-a-bit Stories, Religious Tract Society, London (1932)
- Great-Aunt Amelia, Religious Tract Society, London (1933)
- Nibs: The Story of a Pony, Religious Tract Society, London (1934) (reprinted in hardback by Lutterworth Press in 1942)
- The House of Many Pages, Religious Tract Society, London (1934)
- The Old Lollipop Shop, Religious Tract Society, London (1935)
- The Girl Who Didn't Belong, Religious Tract Society, London (1935)
- The Fourth Form Gang: A School Story for Girls, Girl's Own Paper/Readers Library Publishing Co., London (1935)
- The Fourth Form Gang Again, Girl's Own Paper/Readers Library Publishing Co., London (1936)
- Sally of the Fourth Form Gang, Religious Tract Society, London (1937)
- That Dog Punch, Girl's Own Paper, London (1937)
- Nibs in Clover: A Billy Bunker Story, Ward, Lock & Co., London and Melbourne (1939)
- The House Next Door, Ward, Lock & Co., London and Melbourne (1946)
- That Ass Neddy (illustrated by Stanley Lloyd), Ward, Lock & Co., London and Melbourne (1948) (reprinted 1954)
- Winking Windows, Ward, Lock & Co., London and Melbourne (1954)
- The Poems of Ethel Nokes (For Young and Old), Arthur H. Stockwell, Ilfracombe, Devon (1969)
