= Joseph Finnemore =

Joseph Finnemore (1860–1939) was a prolific book and magazine illustrator who also worked for the Religious Tract Society. He was also a painter in oils.

He was born in Birmingham in 1860 and educated at the Birmingham School of Art and in Antwerp under Charles Verlat. Following a tour of Europe and the Near East in the early 1880s, he settled in London in 1884.

Of his paintings in oils, his works include The Proclamation of King Edward VII at St. James' Palace January 24, 1901 and On the Lookout, A Stormy Night. His illustrations include work for Arthur Conan Doyle.

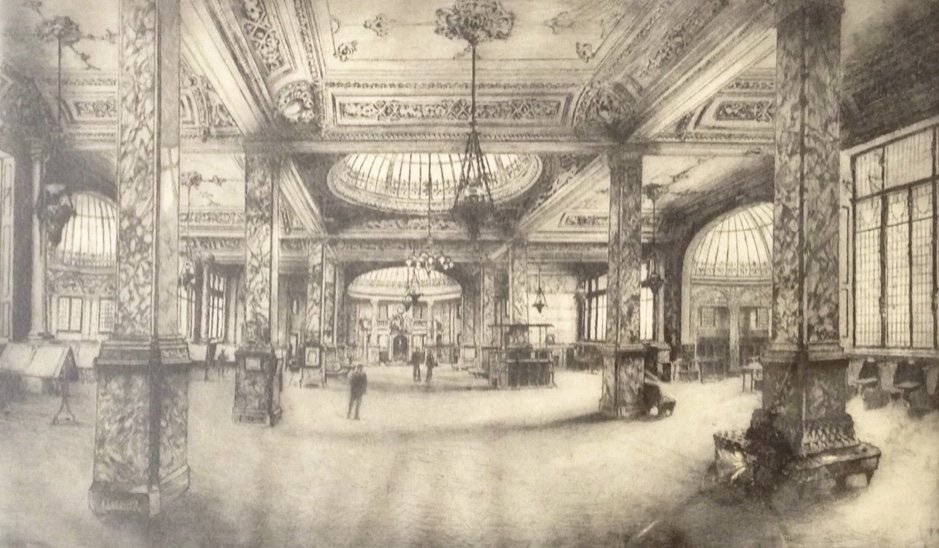
A rare commissioned engraving by Finnemore of the Baltic Exchange dated 1918

He was a member of the Society of Illustrators, the Royal Society of British Artists (from 1893) and Royal Institute (from 1898).

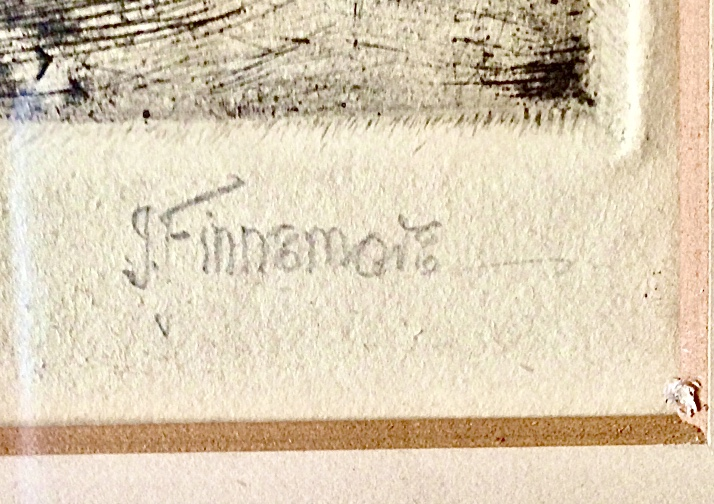
A pencil signature by the artist Joseph Finnemore

== Books illustrated by Joseph Finnemore ==
- Ainsworth, W. Harrison (c. 1930). Old St. Paul's. London: Collins Clear-Type Press.
- Allen, Charles Grant Blairfindie (1888). The White Man's Foot. London: Hatchards. ISBN 9780665050930.
- Bee, Dora. The Battle By The Lake. Religious Tract Society.
- Beer, Alfred (1904). The Heir of Bragwell Hall. London: Religious Tract Society.
- Bone, Florence (1919). Doctor Ogilvie's Guest. Religious Tract Society.
- Cule, W. E. (1926). Sir Knight of the Splendid Way. Religious Tract Society.
- Defoe, Daniel. Life and Strange Surprising Adventures of Robinson Crusoe of York Mariner as Related By Himself. DeWolfe, Fiske & Co. (Also includes illustrations by G.H. Thompson and Archibald Webb.)
- Ellis, Edward S. The Boy Hunters of Kentucky. Chicago: M.A. Donohue & Co.
- Everett-Green, Evelyn (1911). Knights of the Road. London: Thomas Nelson and Sons.
- Finnemore, John (1915). The Animals' Circus: A Book for Children. London: Gale & Polden.
- Gilbert, Henry Franklin Belknap (1916). The Book of Pirates. London: George G. Harrap.
- Gilbert, Henry Franklin Belknap (1902). The Captain of his Soul. London: George Allen.
- Giberne, Agnes (1896). The Girl at the Dower House and Afterward. London and Edinburgh: W. & R. Chambers, Limited.
- Glass, James (1922). Chats over a Pipe: A Tale of Two Brothers. London: Simpkin, Marshall & Co.
- Henty, G. A. (1895). When London Burned: A story of Restoration times and the Great Fire. London: Blackie and Son.
- Hodgetts, James Frederick (1902). Kormak the Viking. London: Religious Tract Society.
- Kelly, Minnie Harding (1920). The Golden City. London: Religious Tract Society.
- Kingsley, Charles (1925). Westward Ho!. London: Religious Tract Society.
- Munroe, Kirk (1922). At War with Pontiac or the Totem of the Bear: a Tale of Redcoat and Redskin. New York, NY: Charles Scribner's Sons.
- Kelly, M. Harding. The Golden City. Pembina, U.S.A.
- Robinson, Maude (1925). Wedded In Prison. Philadelphia: Swarthmore Press.
- Stables, William Gordon (1900). Kidnapped by Cannibals. London; Glasgow & Dublin.
