= Frederica J. Turle =

British writer

Frederica Jane Edith Turle (29 March 1880 – 14 November 1936) was a British author of juvenile fiction.

== Life and works ==
She was born and grew up in Finchley, Middlesex. She married Lt Col Charles Bennett (d. 1932) on 2 October 1912.

She is best known for her story The Gap in the Fence (1914) in the Red Nursery Series, illustrated by Watson Charlton, which is still in print. It is the story of a little girl who is the daughter of a Russian anarchist. Her other works include The Squire's Grandchildren (1906), Jerry O'Shassenagh (n.d.), and The Miser's Well (1909).
