= Edgar Alfred Holloway =

Edgar Alfred Holloway (1870 – 1941) was an illustrator of children's books.

== Biography ==
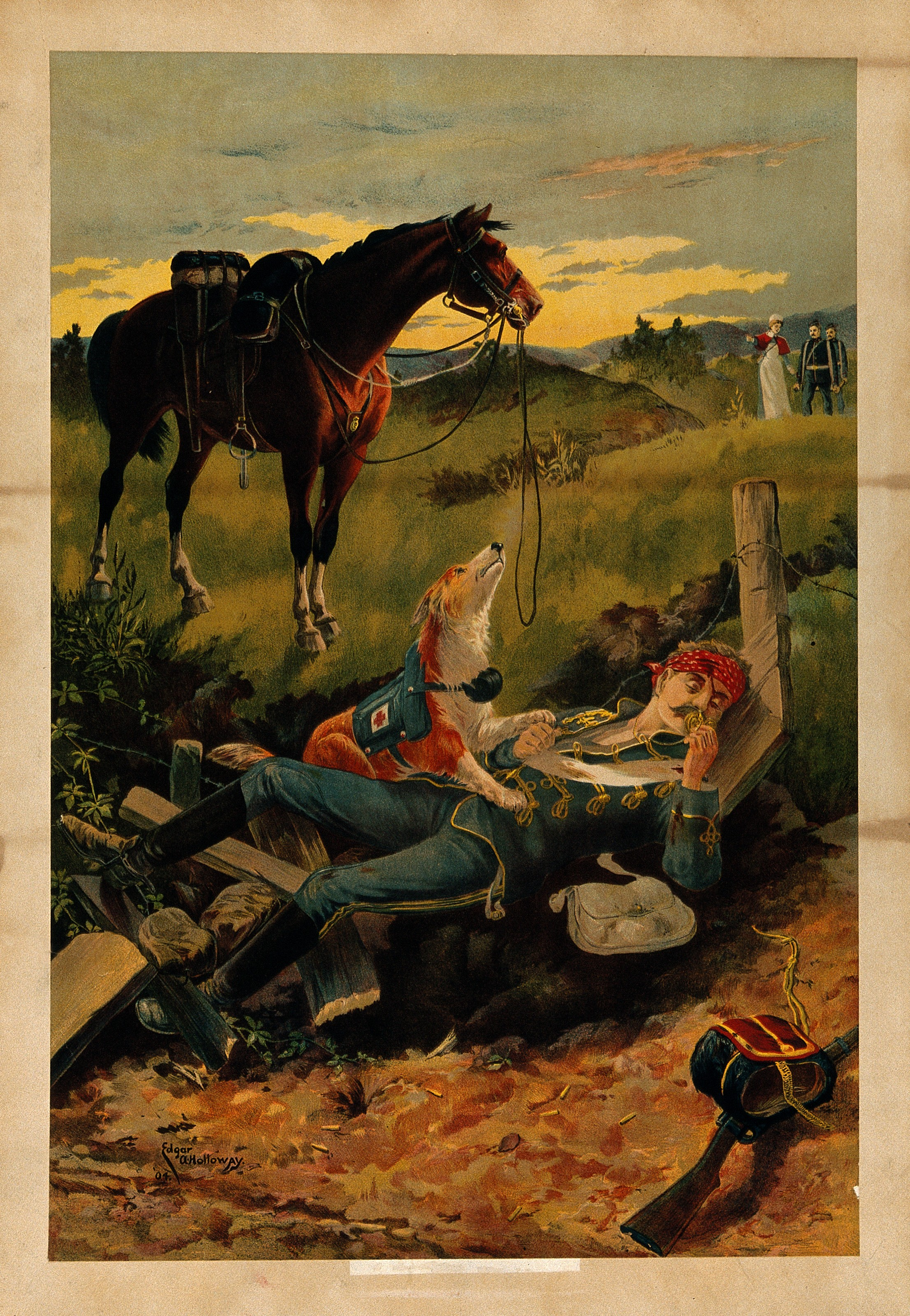
A wounded soldier is found by a rescue dog who alerts the nurse and ambulancemen of their whereabouts

Holloway was born in Doncaster, Yorkshire. He became a war artist during the Boer War. He excelled in military uniform portraits and he worked extensively for Gale and Polden producing military uniform pictures for their postcard series. His illustrations have subsequently been reprinted in books on British army uniforms.

Holloway contributed illustrations to the Boy's Own Paper and Young England magazine and illustrated numerous children's books - mostly adventure books for boys. In 1911 he was living at 35 Milton Road, Hanwell, Middlesex, with his wife Mildred Kate Holloway, son Francis Gilbert Holloway (18) and daughter Leila Mildred Holloway (14). His occupation was stated as painter artist.

Holloway emigrated to Australia in 1920 and illustrated a number of books for the Cornstalk Publishing Company in Sydney. He died in the Sydney suburb of Burwood, in 1941.

Between 1930 and 1941 Edgar married Eva Margaret and went on to do paintings for the Consolation magazine.

== Picture books ==
- ABC of Jolly Jack, London, Gale & Polden, ca. 1920.
- Soldiers of Many Lands, London, Gale & Polden, 1917.
- A wounded soldier is found by a rescue dog who alerts the nurse and ambulancemen of their whereabouts. Coloured chromolithograph, 1904

== Other books illustrated ==
- Owen Vaughan (Owen Rhoscom), Lone Tree Lode, London: Duckworth & Co.,1913.
- W.E. Cule, Rodborough School, Pilgrim Press, 1915.
- D.E. Alarcon, D. Pedro, The Three-Cornered Hat. Cornstalk Publishing Company, Sydney, 1925.
- Mary Grant Bruce, Hugh Stanford's Luck. Cornstalk Publishing Company, Sydney, 1925.
- E. V. Tims (David Roseler). Lawrence, Prince of Mecca. Cornstalk Publishing Company, Sydney, 1927.
- E. V. Tims (David Roseler). The Valley of Adventure. Cornstalk Publishing Company, Sydney, 1929.
