= Watson Charlton =

British illustrator of children's books

Watson Charlton (1874) was a British illustrator of children's books. He was born in Sunderland, Durham, possibly the son of the painter John William Charlton (1848–1917), although there is no mention of him in any records relating to John Charlton, whose two recorded sons were not artists, and both died in the First World war.

== Selected works illustrated by Watson Charlton ==
- Christopher Beck (Thomas Charles Bridges (1868–1944). The Brigand of the Air London:C. Arthur Pearson (1920)
- Shiela E Braine. That Lucky Visit London: The Sunday School Union (1913) 12 illustrations.
- W. E. Cule. Mr Crusoe's Island London: Sunday School Union (1914)
- George Eliot. Silas Marner ... and Scenes of Clerical life (1909)
- Evelyn Everett-Green. Hilary Quest London: Pilgrim Press (1908)
- Albert Lee. A King's Treachery - A Romance of the Huguenot Persecution (1922)
- Robert Leighton. Dreadnoughts Of The Dogger: A Story of the War on the North Sea London: Ward Lock (1916)
- Robert Leighton. The Kidnapped Regiment: a Story of 1745 London:Pilgrim Press (1911)
- Frank Mundell. Captain Cook: The Prince of Navigators London: Andrew Melrose (1907)
- Frank Mundell. James A. Garfield: the backwoods boy who became President London: Andrew Melrose (1907)
- Muriel Pollexfen. Grey Ghost (1910)
- Johann Christoph von Schmid, The Basket of Flowers London (1908) (digitised at
- Frederica J Turle. The Gap in the Fence (1914) digitised at
- Ethel Wiegall. Mrs Trigley's Visitors London:Sunday School Union (c. 1915)

=== Sources ===
The following sources were used:

- Library Hub Discover (the successor to COPAC)
- Children's Fiction 1900-1950 by Cooper and Cooper
- Abe Books
- Project Gutenberg

=== Example of Charton's work ===
Illustrations by Charlton of A Basket of Flowers (subtitled in some editions as Piety and Truth triumphant) translated from the German original of Christoph von Schmid. This book has a simple story. Mary's elderly father is a gardener and basket-maker who lives in a cottage and garden given him by the Count. Mary grows up to love flowers and the God who created them. She becomes friendly with the Count's daughter Amelia, and on her birthday takes her a basket of flowers. When she leaves, a diamond ring is missed, and on the accusation of Juliette, a jealous lady's maid, Mary is chained, dragged off to prison, tried, whipped and condemned to exile. Father and daughter are eventually taken in by a virtuous old couple, and restored to health and activity, cultivating a garden and making baskets. The old father dies a pious death, and Mary puts the basket of flowers on his grave. The friendly old couple are persecuted by their daughter-in-law. Mary, cast out again and again accused of theft, goes to weep on her father's grave where Amelia, who has recognised the basket, comes to tell her that the ring has been found in a magpie's nest. The just are rewarded and the guilty punished.

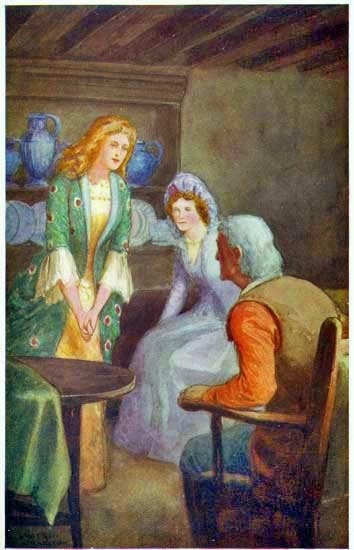
Mary assures her father that she did not take the missing ring

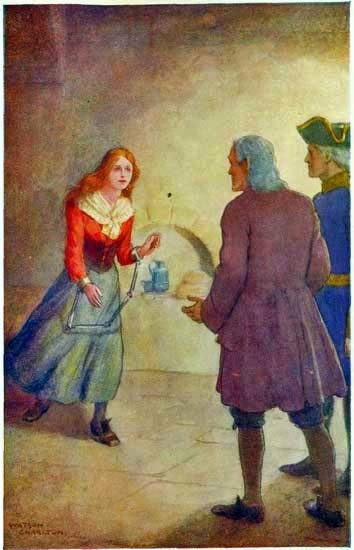
Mary is exiled after being imprisoned and whipped

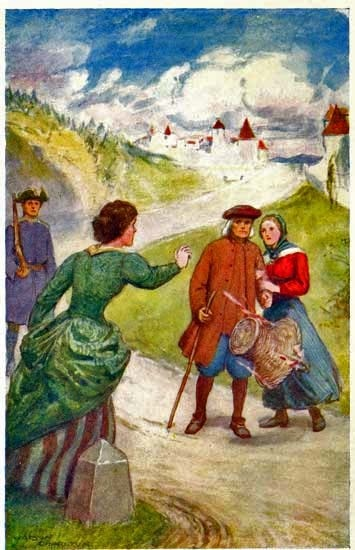
the cruel daughter-in-law casts out the couple who sheltered Mary

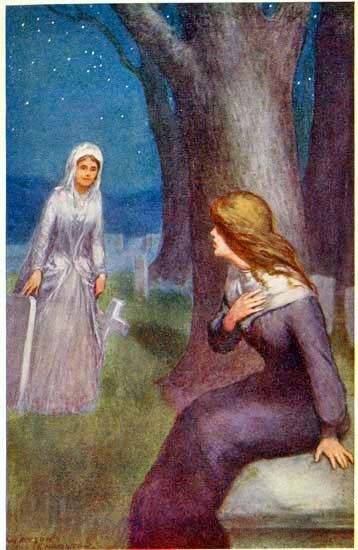
Mary is approached by the Count's Daughter Amelia

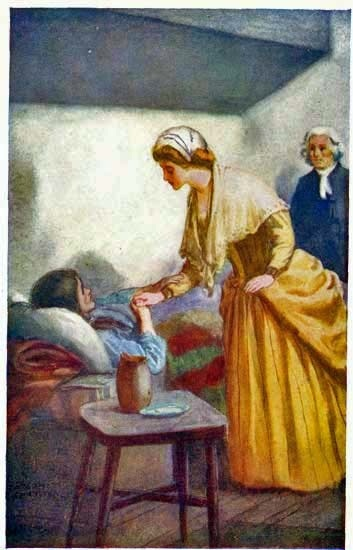
Mary hears the story of the disgraced dying Juliette
