= W. E. Cule =

British writer (1870–1944)

W.E. Cule
- Born: 5 December 1870; St Nicholas near Cardiff, Wales
- Died: 13 July 1944 (aged 73); Aberdare, Wales
- Occupation: Writer (novelist)
- Spouse: Blanche Williams (m. 1897)
- Children: 2
- Writing career
- Period: 20th century
- Genre: Juvenile fiction

William Edward Cule (5 December 1870 – 13 July 1944) was a British author of children's books and several books for adults on Christian themes. In all, he wrote some thirty books encompassing a number of popular genres – public school stories, adventure yarns, fairy tales, novels and Christian allegories and fable. His best children's books show an imaginative faculty of a high order and are soundly crafted, befitting his profession as a magazine and book editor. Cule's most popular Christian works are The Man at the Gate of the World and Sir Knight of the Splendid Way, the latter recently reprinted by Lamplighter Publishing in the United States.

== Life and works ==
Cule was born in 1870 in the village of St Nicholas near the city of Cardiff in Wales, the eldest son of Thomas and Elizabeth Cule. His family moved to Cardiff when his father was appointed as a Customs excise officer. In 1891 Cule was living with his family at 63 Glamorgan Street, Cardiff, and his father was a grocer. The family were devout Baptists and Cule was a committed Christian from an early age, later becoming a Sunday school teacher.

Cule began writing in his teens, and one of his first literary successes was an eisteddfod prize for a poem, awarded by the Welsh preacher poet Evan Gurnos Jones. In 1890 he won an eisteddfod prize for his poem "Violets". Other poems published in the newspaper Barry Dock News included "The Duett Endeth", "Verge of Night: A Fragment","Spring Visitors: A Ballad of Two Chestnuts" and "Learning to Skate: In Seven Chapters". In 1892 he won a prize of a guinea for a poem "True Bravery" published in the Boys' Own Paper.

Cule gave this brief account of his early literary career: "I came to take to writing, I believe, because of my insatiable love of reading, and as a result, also, of my admiration for everybody who wrote books I liked. I was intended for commercial work, and made one or two attempts in that direction, writing all the while in my leisure time. My first efforts, at the age of sixteen or so, were made in the "Literary Olympic" of Young Folk's Paper. This was a page where young authors might exercise their energies and among my companions at that time, but far before me, were two whose names are better known now, Mr R. Murray Gilchrist and Mr A. J. Adcock. My first profitable venture was made in 1892, when Mr Edward Step (now literary adviser to F. Warne and Company) accepted one of my stories for a boy's magazine. In 1894 one of my stories went to Mr Andrew Melrose, manager of the Sunday School Union and it is through his kindness of suggestion and encouragement that most of my work has been done since. In 1895 I was able to devote myself entirely to writing, and in 1899 Mr Melrose published two volumes, Sir Constant and Child Voices; while Messrs W. and R. Chambers brought out a little fairy book, Mabel's Prince Wonderful.

From 1889, Cule was active in the British Amateur Literary Association and in 1891 was elected vice-president. He launched a literary magazine and review for young people" called Opinion which was issued for five or six months "at a great loss!" In one of his editorials Cule argued for the introduction of schools of journalism such as exist in America to improve the standing of what "is now a despised and almost contemptible calling".

After leaving school locally, Cule worked as a journalist in Cardiff and Porthcawl. His first public school stories were published in the Boy's Own Paper and in the Young England magazine. Collections of these stories were subsequently issued in book form, the first such collection being Barfield's Blazer. He married Blanche Williams in 1897. In 1901, Cule and his wife were living at 41 Romilly Road, Canton, Cardiff, with their daughters Mabel (2) and Dilys (5 months).

In 1900, Cule was appointed editor of the Sunday School Teacher magazine, which was afterwards merged in the Sunday School Chronicle.

He received encouragement from Andrew Melrose the publisher for the Sunday School Union after submitting a story to him. Melville published Cule's first two books in 1899 – Child Voices, a collection of sketches and stories about children, and Sir Constant Knight of the Great King, an allegory of the Christian life. The same year, W.& R.Chambers published his fairyland book Mabel's Prince Wonderful, whose heroine was named after Cule's eldest daughter Mabel.

Chambers had earlier published a number of his adult short stories including "Lady Stalland's Diamonds", "The Anthropologist's Coat", "Old Mr. Jellicoe's Plan" and "Lord Cumberwell's Lesson".

In 1903 Cule moved to London to take up a position in the publishing department of the National Sunday School Union. He continued to write boys' stories while also contributing serials to The Child's Own Magazine which were later published in the "Red Nursery" series of children's books. The White Caravan, Two Little New Zealanders and Mr Crusoe's Island are examples of serials that later became popular books.

In 1906, Cule's youngest daughter Dilys died of a childhood illness. A touching account of how the family rallied to furnish a doll's house for her is given in Dilys in the Christmas Garden. Her death is also alluded to in a story from the fairy tale collection The Rose-Coloured Bus, which tells of a grieving woodcarver who makes a doll's house for his daughter.

In 1906 Cule was appointed on the recommendation of Andrew Melrose and Rev Carey Bonner to head the publishing activities of the Baptist Missionary Society (BMS). Cule worked as an editor of missionary publications, including the monthly Missionary Herald and a children's magazine Wonderlands. He was instrumental in setting up the Carey Press as the BMS's commercial publishing arm.

In 1911 he was living at 12 Genesta Road Westcliff, Southend-on-Sea, with his wife Blanche and their daughters Mabel (aged 12) and Daisy Elizabeth (aged 9). His occupation is stated as Publishing Manager and Author.

Cule remained with the BMS for thirty years until his retirement, combining his professional editorial and publishing activities with his career as a popular writer.

Cule published five volumes of public school stories, which went through numerous reprints. All are good-humoured and entertaining stories with plots that often turn on the personal foibles of the characters, whether boys or schoolmasters. Cule is a moralist but a genial one: his stories uphold the public school values of honesty, generosity, sportsmanship and service to others. Typical of these is Barfield's Blazer, described by one reviewer as "... a volume to be greatly prized and thoroughly enjoyed, the entire series of stories affording delicious reading accompanied by rare hearty schoolboy fun. The stories have been well conceived and worked with remarkable skill and taste."

Rollinson and I, the story of a public school boy accused of an offence he did not commit and sent to Coventry, is a full-length novel that explores the themes of personal integrity, moral courage and loyalty to friends. The White Knights is not a school story but tells of three boys who elect to live by the values of medieval chivalry. They realise this ideal through acts of service to others. The enemy the "knights" have to fight is the innate human tendency towards selfishness. As this story unfolds, we are made aware of the Great War being fought just across the English Channel. In the Secret Sea, originally published as a serial in the Boy's Own Paper, is a "tale of the desert island variety, better written than most".

Cule has a sure touch with fairy tale and fantasy. Mabel's Prince Wonderful tells of a little girl's visit to the land of fairy tales and nursery rhymes, where she becomes caught up in the story of Cinderella and Prince Charming. One reviewer commented: The wonderful adventures and encounters of "The Child Who Believes" are told in the most graphic and convincing manner, and the juvenile reader who remains incredulous of the existence of "The Old World" after reading the entrancing story of Mabel and her fairy prince, deserves to be passed over by Santa on his annual visit.

His later work,The Other Side of Nod is the story of a boy transported by a white car into the fairy tale land of Nod. Neither story is an allegory but a careful reading of them reveals that for Cule (as with George Macdonald) the "storybook world" of the imagination is linked to the Christian concept of the Kingdom of Heaven. These must be counted among Cule's most appealing children's books and worthy of reprinting. Some of the original fairy tales in the Rose-Coloured Bus are equally fine although the collection as a whole is less inspired.

Child Voices is a collection of whimsical sketches of children which Cule in his Preface says are not intended for children's reading. "For the greater part . . . they are simple records of incidents observed and children's conversations overheard. In other cases, stories have been framed upon a fanciful child's views and opinions of various matters. The result is dedicated, in all humility, to those who know and love their children."

Two Little New Zealanders, The White Caravan, and The House of the Ogress are examples of Cule's children's fiction. They address children's emotional needs and their experiences when they do not receive love from adults. The stories unfold to their conclusions and feature settings such as Southern England or Edwardian London.

Less successful are the serials Cule wrote for Wonderlands (under the pseudonym of Edward Seaman) and later published as books. Both The Parliament Man and The Adventures of Peter Playne are spoilt by religious sentimentality and didacticism, as are the short stories The Special Messenger and Peter, Bingo and Those Others. Under Eastern Skies, a retelling of stories about Old Testament kings is a workmanlike but otherwise undistinguished book. The Bells of Moulton – a history of the BMS for young people – could have been a dull subject but is entertainingly told by combining history, fiction and travelogue.

Cule's novelette The Prince of Zell is a curiosity – a Ruritanian romance with a wildly improbable plot and a denouement that strains credulity to the limit. However, the short stories included as a makeweight reveal Cule's talent for social comedy in the manner of H. G. Wells. Another such story – "The Auburn Emperor" – appears in Six Roads to Bethlehem. No indication is given as to where the stories in this collection were first published – they apparently come from different stages in Cule's career and make an awkward and uneven collection.

Another curiosity is the parable Thy Son Liveth: A Vision of the War, published in 1915. It tells of an unnamed son of an unnamed English couple who perishes in the Great War, dashing the parents' hopes for his great future. Though unsatisfying as fiction, it expresses Cule's deep conviction as a Christian that life continues after death. One contemporary review described it as "... a beautifully written little work of six chapters which should commend itself to the people, especially to those whose sons have gone forth in the country's defence.

Cule's two masterpieces are his allegorical Sir Knight of the Splendid Way and the fable of The Man at the Gate of the World.

Sir Knight of the Splendid Way is an extensive reworking of his earlier book Sir Constant Knight of the Great King, published in 1899. Reviewing this, the Spectator said "This is an allegorical tale, modelled, we may say, on the lines of the "Pilgrim's Progress," the wayfarer in this case being a knight. He has a "chart of the journey," as the pilgrim has his roll, meets the peril of temptation in the "Palace of Sir Joyous," and finds it again in another shape in "The Black Knight of Law." There is some imagination and some power of expression in Sir Constant, but the allegories that have achieved a real success are very few."Sir Knight of the Splendid Way tells of the knighting of Sir Constant in the Chapel of the Valley of Decision (his conversion) and the six "adventures" he undergoes on his way to the City of the King (eternal life), each testing his courage, fortitude and compassion for others. Drawing for its inspiration on Bunyan's Pilgrim's Progress, the Arthurian tradition of the questing knight and the New Testament epistles, it is a spiritually profound and richly detailed work, written in a language suggestive of another era with some of the finest examples of word painting Cule ever achieved. W.Y. Fullerton wrote of Cule's allegory: "For depth of experience and daintiness of touch, it may be placed alongside The Pilgrim's Progress itself without suffering by the comparison, and there can be no higher praise." Sir Knight of the Splendid Way was published with illustrations by Joseph Finnemore.

The Man at the Gate of the World is the story of Caspar, one of the three magi of tradition who follow the star to the stable in Bethlehem. It tells of how Caspar subsequently forswears his wealth and privilege to stand at a city gate washing the feet of weary travellers, thus fulfilling Christ's mandate to his disciples. Cule tells us he meditated on this story for some time before writing it. He wondered whether to publish it after reading Henry Van Dyke's parable The Other Wise Man but decided his "Story of the Star" had its own spiritual truth that he was impelled to share.

A popular Christmas book, The Man at the Gate of the World was published in England with line illustrations by the painter Estella Canziani and in the United States with illustrations by Albert R. Thayer. It has been anthologised with the Van Dyke work.

Both works have been translated into other European languages.

Cule, who served as a Sunday School teacher and Baptist deacon, wrote two hymns of distinction, "Creator Lord of Life and Light" and "The Morning's Golden Glory", published in Hymns for Today.

Cule retired from the BMS in 1936. His retirement was spent at Thorpe Bay and during the war years at Clevedon, Barmouth and Aberdare, where he died in 1944, having been predeceased by his wife.

== Works by W E Cule ==
School Stories and Adventure

Barfield's Blazer and Other School Stories, Andrew Melrose, London, 1900

The Captain's Fags, Sunday School Union, London, 1901

The Black Fifteen and Other School Stories, 1906

Rollinson and I: The Story of a Summer Term, Religious Tract Society, London, 1913

Rodborough School, (illustrated by Edgar Alfred Holloway), Religious Tract Society, London, 1915

Baker Secundus and Some Other Fellows (illustrated by Arthur Twidle) Boy's Own Paper Office, London, 1917

The White Knights 1919

In the Secret Sea, Sheldon Press, London, 1934

Fairy Tale and Fantasy

Child Voices, (illustrated by Charles Robinson), Andrew Melrose, London, 1899

Mabel's Prince Wonderful: Or a Trip to Storyland, (illustrated by Will G. Mein), W&R Chambers, London, Edinburgh, 1899

The Rose-Coloured Bus and Other Leaves from Mabel's Fairy Book, (illustrated by Florence Meyerheim), Andrew Melrose, London, 1906

The Other Side of Nod, 1924

Children's and Juvenile Fiction

Three Little Wise Men, (illustrated by Florence Meyerheim), Sunday School Union, London, 1896

The Kingdoms of this World, (illustrated by H. L. Shindler → né Harry Lumsden Shindler; 1870–1964), Sunday School Union, London, 1904

The Lost Prince and the Golden Lamp, Sunday School Union, London, c1900.

Tom and Company, Limited, Sunday School Union, London, 1908

Two Little New Zealanders, (illustrated by Rosa C. Petherick), Sunday School Union, London, 1909

The Magic Uncle, Sunday School Union, London, 1911

Santa Claus at the Castle, (illustrated by Florence Meyerheim), Sunday School Union, London,1913

Mr Crusoe's Island, (illustrated by Watson Charlton), Sunday School Union, London, 1914

The White Caravan, (illustrated by Brian Hatton), Sunday School Union, London, 1914

The House of the Ogress, (illustrated by George Morrow), 1921

The Indian Storybook for Boys and Girls, Carey Press, London, c1921

The Adventures of Peter Playne, Carey Press, London, 1923

Peter, Bingo and Those Others, Carey Press, London, 1926

The Special Messenger, Carey Press, London, 1927

The Angel at the Door, 1930

The Parliament Man: A Story of Greyhound Court and Other Places, (illustrated by Ernest Prater), Carey Press, London, 1931

Bible Stories and Missionary History

Under Eastern Skies, John F. Shaw, London, 1913

The Bells of Moulton: A History of the Baptist Missionary Society for Young People, The Carey Press, London, 1942

Christian Allegory and Fable

Sir Constant: Knight of the Great King, (illustrated by Amelia Bauerle), Andrew Melrose, London, 1899

Thy Son Liveth: A Vision of the War. Nisbet & Co., London, 1915

Sir Knight of the Splendid Way, (illustrated by J. Finnemore), Religious Tract Society, London, 1926

The Man at the Gate of the World: A Story of the Star, [illustrated by Estelle Canzioni), 1929

Romance and Short Stories

The Prince of Zell: A Romance, 1908

Six Roads to Bethlehem, Sunday School Union, London, 1944

Memorial

Dilys in the Christmas Garden, Bagster, London, 1931 (reprinted in Six Roads to Bethlehem)

Edited Works

The Missionary Speaker and Reader A Collection of Recitations, Dialogues, Readings, and Responsive Services, The Carey Press, London, 1910

Everyland for Boys and Girls (children's annuals, illustrated by B. F. Gribble), The Carey Press, London, 1925–1926
