= Amelia Bauerle =

British painter, illustrator and etcher

- Born: Amalie Mathilde Bauerle; 12 November 1873; Bayswater, London, United Kingdom
- Died: 4 March 1919 (aged 45)
- Education: South Kensington School of Art; Slade School of Fine Art
- Known for: Painting, Illustration, Printmaking
- Movement: Art Nouveau

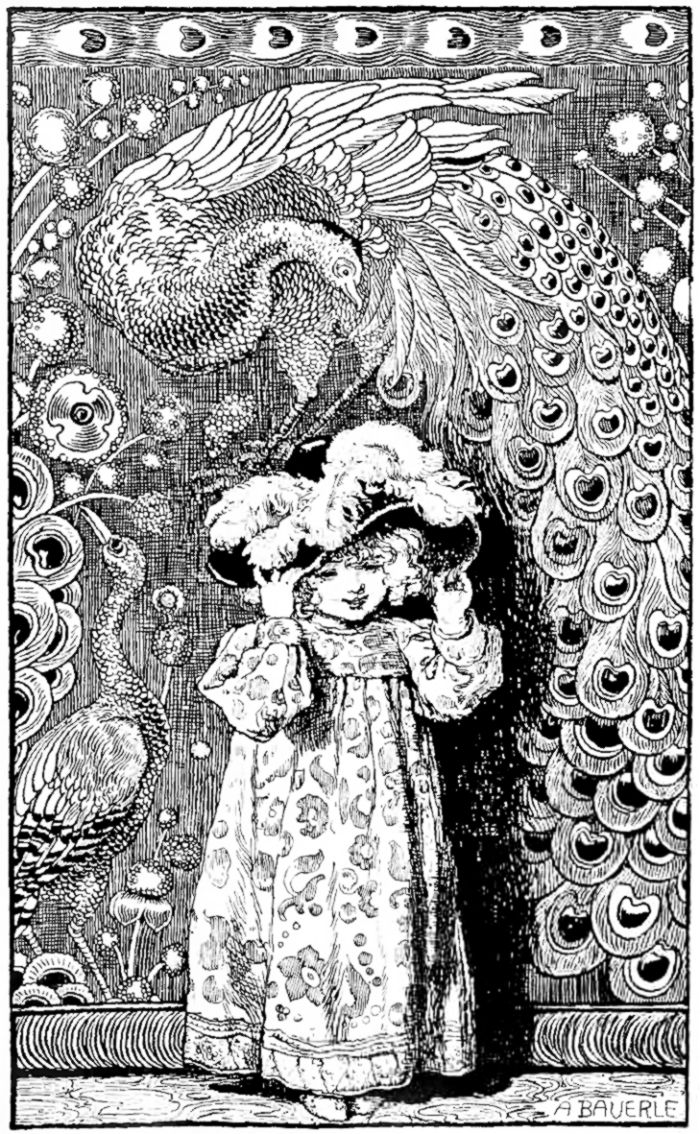
Fine Feathers make Fine Birds, An Illustration by Amalie Bauerle, from The Yellow Book Volume XIII April 1897

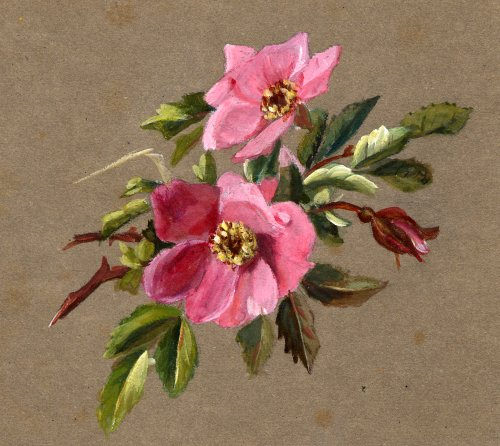
Flower study by Amelia Bowerley

Amalie Mathilde Bauerle (12 November 1873 – 4 March 1916), known as Amelia Bauerle, was a British painter, illustrator and etcher. She also used the anglicised name Amelia Matilda Bowerley.

== Early life ==
Bauerle was born in the Bayswater area of London on 12 November 1873. She was the daughter of the German artist Karl Wilhelm Bauerle [de] (1831–1912), who had moved to England in 1869. Her siblings Karl Theodor Bauerle and Martha Bauerle also became artists.

== Career ==
Bauerle studied at the South Kensington School of Art and the Slade School of Fine Art at the Kensington Museum in London. At the Slade School she trained as an etcher under Frank Short. She then travelled in Italy and Germany.

Bauerle exhibited paintings at the Royal Academy from 1897 until her death, and also exhibited in Paris and America. She was an associate member of the Royal Society of Painter-Printmakers.

Bauerle also contributed illustrations, typically Art Nouveau in style, to The Artist Engraver, The Yellow Book and magazines Sphere, Graphic, and Windsor. She often depicted young children, flowers, angels or mermaids in her work. Other work included providing the illustrations for children's books, such as The Child Lover's Calendar (1909), The Wonderful Visit (1902) and A Wonder Book for Girl's and Boys (1903).

When the 1911 census was enumerated, Bauerle was living at a boarding house in Langhorne Gardens, Folkestone, her occupation was recorded as artist and her marital status was single.

== Death ==
Bauerle died from influenza on 4 March 1919.

== Exhibitions and catalogues ==
- Catalogue of a series of water colours and etchings: When the world was young' by Amelia M. Bauerlé. London: Dowdeswell Galleries, 1908.

== Selected book illustrations ==
- Ismay Thorn. Happy-go-lucky. Roseleaf Library, London, 1894.
- W. E. Cule, Sir Constant: Knight of the Great King. Andrew Melrose, London, 1899.
- Frederic William Farrar. Allegories. Longmans & Co., London, 1898.
- Alfred Tennyson. The Day-Dream (poem) In: Flowers of Parnassus. vol. 7. [1900, etc.] 8º.
- Nathaniel Hawthorne. A Wonder Book for Girl's and Boys, Ward, Lock, & Co., London, 1903.

== Selected paintings ==
- And o and o the Daisies Blow
- Auccasin and Nicolette, 1901
- A Boy of Tenerife, 1904 (etching)
- Children Amongst Foxgloves
- Children with Grapes
- Evensong
- Fairytales
- Flower Land
- When The Meadows Laugh

== Sources ==
- Amelia Bauerle
- John Lane. The Yellow Book, An Illustrated Quarterly, London, April 1897.
