= Young England (magazine) =

Young England: A Illustrated Magazine for Boys Throughout the English-Speaking World is a British story paper that was published from 1880 until 1937 and aimed at a similar audience to the Boy's Own Paper.

== Publishing history ==
The paper was published by the London Sunday School Union and was a continuation of an earlier children's periodical, Kind Words for Boys and Girls. The first issue went on sale on 3 January 1880. The paper began as a weekly, but became a monthly and finally an annual, publication.

From 1880 to around 1933, Young England annuals were republished as Young Canada: An Illustrated Annual for Boys, "interspersed with a modicum of additional Canadian material."

== Contents ==
The paper had adventure, school and historical stories; articles on topics such as science, natural history, sports, hobbies and crafts; as well as verse, competitions and puzzles.

== Notable contributors ==
Among its contributors were Fenton Ash, Harold Avery, R. M. Ballantyne, T. C. Bridges, Frank T. Bullen, W. E. Cule, C. J. Cutcliffe Hyne, Henty Frith, Ross Harvey, G. A. Henty, Ascott R. Hope, W. H. G. Kingston, David Ker, J. P. Lamb, Robert Leighton, Percy Longhurst, George Manville Fenn, Rosa Mulholland, F. St. Mars, Dr William Gordon Stables, Percy F. Westerman and Fred Whishaw.

== List of editors ==
- Benjamin Clarke (1880 - 1889)
- Thomas Archer (1889 - 1894)
- Horace George Groser (c. 1920s)

== Other papers of similar title ==
The annual Young Australia : An Illustrated Magazine for Boys Throughout the English-speaking World comprised the twelve monthly issues of Young England bound and issued with a new title for colonial sale.
