= Carey Press =

Publishing arm of the Baptist Missionary Society

The Carey Press was founded in the early 20th century as the commercial publishing arm of the Baptist Missionary Society and was named after the society's founder William Carey (1761–1834). The founding editor was W E Cule (1870–1944). He was succeeded by Ernest Alexander Payne (1902–1980). The Carey Press published church- and missionary-related publications, devotional works, and junior Christian fiction, as well as general titles. The Carey Press later merged with Kingsgate Press to become Carey Kingsgate Press.

== Sources ==
- Brian Stanley, History of the Baptist Missionary Society 1792–1992. Edinburgh: T&T Clark, 1992.
