= Siegmund Hildesheimer =

German-born British publisher (1832–1896)

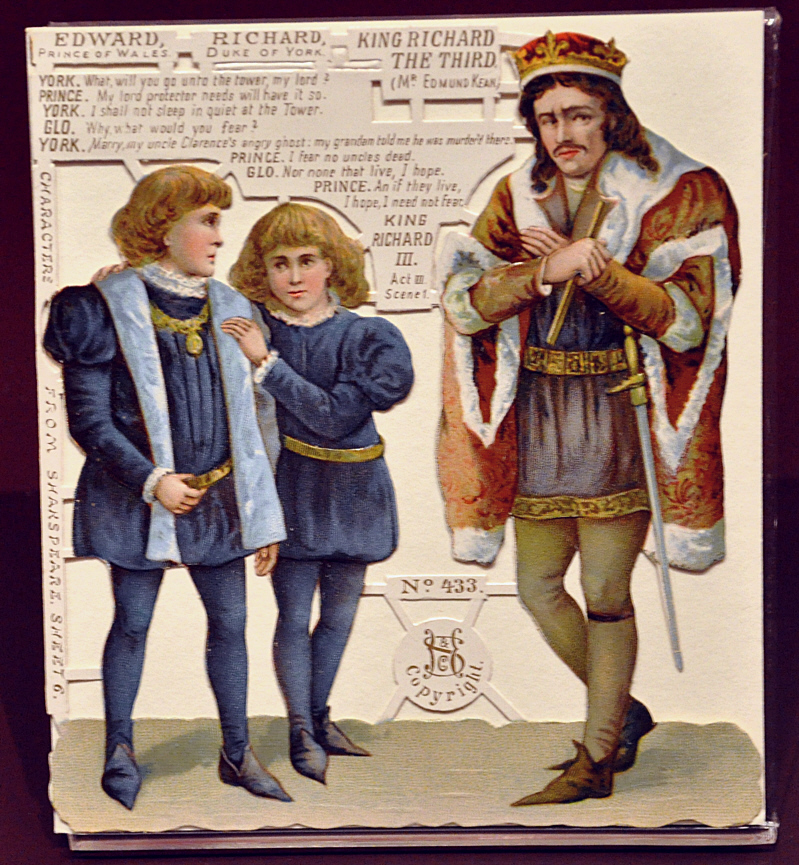
Scrap character card of Richard III produced by Siegmund Hildesheimer

Siegmund Hildesheimer (1832–1896) was a German-born British publisher, best known for Christmas and other greetings cards, and postcards, produced by Siegmund Hildesheimer & Co Ltd, in London and Manchester.

He was born in Halberstadt, Germany, the son of Abraham Hildesheimer and Sara Meyer. He moved to Manchester, England in the mid-1870s.

His younger brother Albert Hildesheimer (1843–1924) was also active in publishing Christmas cards, and in 1881 went into partnership with Charles William Faulkner, as Hildesheimer & Faulkner, with offices at 41 Jewin Street, London.

On 15 August 1858, Hildesheimer married Pauline Hirsh, and they had two daughters, Margarethe Hildesheimer and Anna Hildesheimer.

He used some of Beatrix Potter's early drawings of rabbits for Christmas cards that he published.
