= Crossing of the Danube Cross =

Crossing of the Danube Cross Crucea Trecerea Dunării
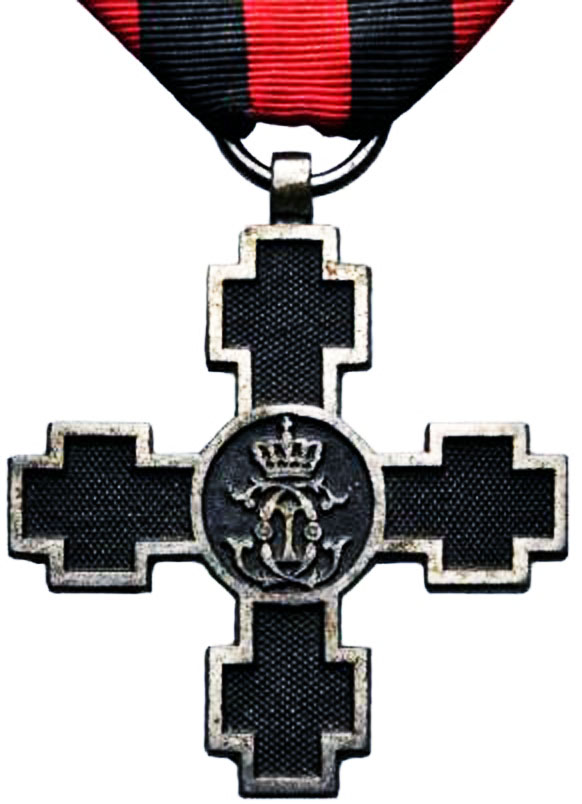

Awarded by King of Romania
- Type: Chivalric state Decoration
- Religious affiliation: Romanian Orthodox
- Ribbon: Bright red and black
- Eligibility: Civil, Military
- Awarded for: Outstanding leadership and contributions in the Romanian War of Independence
- Status: Abolished in 1947
- Sovereign: King Michael I of Romania
- Grades: Knight; Member

Precedence
- Next (higher): Decoration of the Cross of Sanitary Merit
- Civil Military; The ribbons of the decoration

The Crossing of the Danube Cross (Romanian: Crucea Trecerea Dunării) was a Decoration established by Prince Carol I of Romania by Royal Decree 617 on 23 March 1878 to award individuals for outstanding leadership and contributions in the Romanian War of Independence.

The crossing of the Danube was one of the key events in the campaign, and it was one of the six events selected by Prince Carol to be immortalised in the six paintings commissioned from Johann Nepomuk Schönberg, and Austrian artist and war-correspondent.

The Decoration was later awarded to very few individuals who were deemed to have proven great leadership.

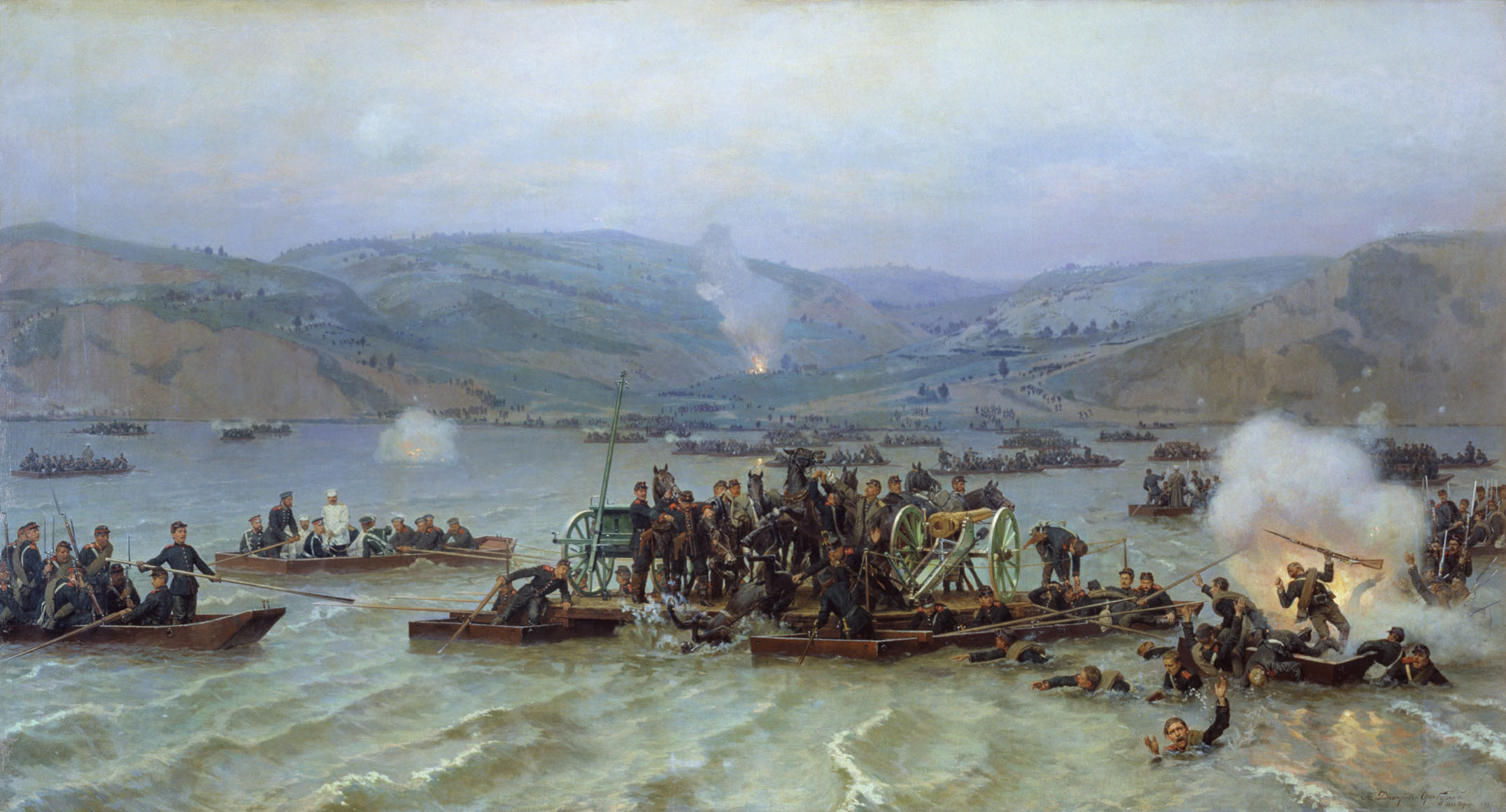
Russian forces crossing of the Danube, June 1877, painting by Nikolai Dmitriev-Orenburgsky, 1883. The crossing was only possible because the Russians and Romanians had destroyed all the Turkish craft and then mined the river.

The Decoration was named after the Danube River where the Romanian Army fought the Ottoman Imperial Army.

The Decoration was abolished during the abolishment of the Romanian Monarchy in 1947 and was not reinstated as a Dynastic Decoration of the Decorations of the Romanian Royal House by Former King Michael I.
