= John Percy Groves =

British author, soldier, and librarian

- Born: 26 October 1850; Bath, Somerset, England]
- Died: 13 February 1916 (aged 65); Southend-on-Sea, Essex, England
- Other name: Lt.Col. Percy Groves
- Occupations: Author; librarian; soldier
- Years active: 1868–1904
- Known for: Histories of the Scottish regiments
- Notable work: The Royal Guernsey Militia

John Percy Groves (26 October 1850 – 13 February 1916) was a British author, librarian, and soldier. He wrote stirring adventure stories and information books for boys, all with a military theme, as well as military history, mostly about the Scottish regiments.

== Early life ==
Groves was born in Bath on 26 October 1850 to John Richard Groves (1803–1850) and Elizabeth Louisa Groves (née Priaulx) (1790–1860). His father was a former major in the Rifle Brigade, and his mother was sister to Osmond de Beauvoir Priaulx who donated the Priaulx Library to the people of Guernsey. Groves was baptised at Bathwick St Mary, Somerset, on 27 November 1850.

In 1861 the census found Groves as a pupil at Wing Rectory in Rutland. This was close to Uppingham School, which he may have later attended. He certainly did attend the Royal Military College, Sandhurst, from where in 1867 he purchased a commission as an ensign.

== Military career ==
Groves purchased a commission as an ensign in the 67th (South Hampshire) Regiment of Foot on 10 February 1869. He was promoted to Lieutenant on 1 November 1871. This promotion was later backdated (without pay) to 28 October 1871, with the proviso that the commission be non-saleable. This was part of the reform of the purchase system in the British Army under the Cardwell Reforms.

Grove exchanged into the 27th Regiment of Foot (the Inniskilling Fusiliers) on 27 March 1872. He resigned his commission on 25 March 1873, just a fortnight after he got married. He was appointed to the reserve of officers on 11 March 1881. After moving to Guernsey he joined the Royal Guernsey Militia, being appointed major on 11 May 1889. By July 1892 he was promoted to he rank of lieutenant-colonel in the Royal Guernsey Artillery.

== Marriage and family ==
Groves married Harriet Augusta Raines (c. 1849 – 24 September 1908) at Christ Church, Marylebone, Westminster, on 11 March 1873. Raines was the daughter of Joseph Robert Raines, a retired colonel and the sister of General Sir Julius Augustus Raines, K.C.B., Colonel of the Buffs. One of the couple's sons assumed the name Groves-Raines, and the other eventually dropped his Groves surname to leave Raines in place. A fortnight after the marriage, Groves resigned from the military.

The couple had eight children, seven of whom survived to adulthood:

- George Percy Raines Groves (1874–1962) became an actor known as George Percy Raines
- John Henry Osborne Groves (1875–1929)
- Ralph Gore Devereux Groves (1877–1953) adopted the surname Groves-Raines.
- William Frederick Priaulx Groves (1878–1969)
- Grace Elizabeth Marjorie Groves (1880–1881) died in infancy.
- Katherine Frances Groves (1883–1977)
- Osmond de Beauvoir Groves (1884–1909)
- Stephen Percy Groves (1886–1947)

Grove was appointed bursar of Bradfield College in April 1883, but left the post by the end of the summer term. However, in the meantime, he had reinvigorated the College's Rifle Corps. In the 1881 census Grove (with five children under seven years of age in the house) recorded his occupation as: Owner Of House Property in Middlesex.

== Writing and librarianship ==
Groves wrote three types of books. The first two were intended for the juvenile market, and the last was for those interested in particular regiments. As a rule all were illustrated.

- Adventure stories with a military theme for boys.
- Annuals or informative books for boys.
- Military history, usually focusing on the history of a particular regiment.

Groves began to publish juvenile fiction in 1883 with From Cadet to Captain of which the Reading Observer said: This is a wholesome and well-written tale put into autobiographical form and detailing in an interesting way the varied incidents of a young aspirant for military honours. A large part of the story is occupied with Mr. Warrington's experiences as a student at the Sandhurst Military College.... His next book was Charmouth Grange in 1886, of which The Graphic said: This tale of the seventeenth century is a will written story, full of the doings of Roundhead and Cavaliers, in which the Cavaliers get very much the best of it.

Until his appointment as Librarian at the Priaulx Library, only one of the first ten books written by Groves was a military history, the history of the 66th (Berkshire) Regiment of Foot in 1887. Groves was appointed as Secretary and Librarian to the Priaulx Library in Guernsey and the cultured librarian was there for the official opening on 1 May 1889. The library had been donated by Grove's wife's uncle, Osmond de Beauvoir Priaulx, and this no doubt played a part in the selection of Groves for the role.

de Beauvoir died on 15 January 1891, leaving a personal estate (i.e. excluding any real property, which at the time was often entailed) valued at £53,000. Groves got a bequest of 100 shares of Pennsylvania Railroad Company stock. This was probably worth over $10,000 at the time, as the average value of the shares for 1890 – 1899 was $109.30.

Once installed at Candie House, the home of the Library, Groves continued his literary career. He and his family had a large apartment at Candie House, but given the size of his family it was not surprising that he was criticised for spilling outside his apartment and appropriating some of the rooms intended for the library. In the 1891 census, Groves describes himself as major of the Royal Guernsey Artillery Brigade, and an author and journalist.

Grove was still writing, in 1891 alone, he published two juvenile novels, a juvenile history book (with three different publishers). In 1893 he began to publish a series of volumes about the Scottish regiments. He intended to produce 17 in all. Advertisements These were high quality, limited editions (530 for the book on the 21st Royal Scots Fusiliers), with nine high-class chromo-lithographed illustrations. They sold for 7s 6d.

Apart from one final work, on the Royal Regiment of Fusiliers, published in Guernsey in 1904, Groves had effectively stopped writing books by 1896. By 1901, only three teen-aged children were now living at home. In that year he described himself as Secretary and Curator, Priaulx Library, Author, and Journalist.

Harriet Groves died on 24 September 1908 leaving effects valued at only £22 8s 9d. All of the children were adult. Groves resigned his librarianship in 1910 and left Guernsey (his housing was tied to his post). By the time of the 1911 census, Groves was living in Whitefield, Christchurch, near Bournemouth with his son John Henry, who had left the army to become a poultry farmer. Groves gave his profession at Lt.Col (retired) and Literature.

Groves remarried on 16 February 1912 at Hanwell Middlesex. His second bride was Mary Louisa Ridley (c. 1855 – 23 March 1935), the eldest daughter of the late Rev. Oliver Matthew Ridley (c. 1825 – 10 January 1907) and Louisa Pole Ridley (c. 1829 – January 1858). Although Mary's mother had dies when she was around three, her father remarried before she was eight. Groves and Mary were respectively 65 and 61 when they married.

== Death ==
Groves died in Southend-on-Sea on 13 February 1916. While some sources place his death on Guernsey in 1917 or 1918, three contemporary newspapers place the death at Southend in February 1916. Groves was survived by his second wife Mary (by nearly 20 years), and by six of his children).

== Works ==
The majority of what Groves wrote was juvenile fiction when measured by both the number of works or the number of pages.

=== Juvenile market ===
Novels and other books for the juvenile market by John Percy Groves
| No. | Year | Title | Illustrated by | Publisher | BL Cat. |
|---|---|---|---|---|---|
| 1 | 1883 | From Cadet to Captain, etc. | Stanley Berkley 8 full page illustrations | London Edinburgh: Griffith & Farran. | Yes |
| 2 | 1884 | Charmouth Grange. A tale of the seventeenth century | 8 full page illustrations and some smaller illustrations | London: Sampson Low & Co. | Yes |
| 3 | 1885 | Sketches of Adventure and Sport. A book for boys. | 24 Chromo lithographic illustrations | London: B. Ollendorff | Yes |
| 4 | 1886 | A soldier born, or the adventures of a Subaltern of the 95th in the Crimea and Indian Mutiny. | W. Pearce | London, Edinburgh : Griffith, Farran & Co | Yes |
| 5 | 1888 | Reefer and Rifleman: a tale of the two services | John Schönberg-6 full page illustrations | London: Blackie & Sons | Yes |
| 6 | 1887 | The Duke's Own, or the adventures of Peter Daly, etc. | Lieut.-Col. Marshman: 12 Illustrations | London, Edinburgh : Griffith, Farran & Co | Yes |
| 7 | 1887 | The War of the Axe: or, adventures in South Africa, etc. | John Schönberg | London: Blackie & Son | Yes |
| 8 | 1887 | The Major's Campaign: Or My First Battle and My Last | "A large number of illustrations" - bookseller | London: Frederick Warne and Co | No |
| 9 | 1888 | Anchor and Laurel: a tale of the Royal Marines | Lieut.-Col. Marshman: 12 Illustrations | London, Edinburgh : Griffith, Farran & Co | Yes |
| 10 | 1890 | “On Service” at home and abroad | Harry Payne and Arthur Payne | London Saxony [printed]: R. Tuck & Sons | Yes |
| 11 | 1890 | On an Off Duty | Harry Payne and Arthur Payne | London, Paris, New York: Raphael Tuck & Sons. | Yes |
| 12 | 1891 | Tar-bucket and Pipe-clay, or, the life and adventures of Nicholas Brodribb, Middy and Marine | | London: Griffith & Farran | Yes |
| 13 | 1891 | With the Green Jackets: or, the life and adventures of a rifleman, etc. | Lieut.-Col. Marshman | London: Griffith & Farran | Yes |
| 14 | 1891 | Ready Aye Ready: Annals of Military Heroes | Harry Payne and Arthur Payne | London, Paris, New York: Raphael Tuck & Sons. | No |
| 15 | 1895 | In the Days of King George. | Harry Payne | London: Cassell & Co. | Yes |
| 16 | 1895 | With Claymore and Bayonet, or the “Ross-shire Buffs,” etc. | Harry Payne, 8 full page illus. | London: Cassell & Co. | Yes |
| 17 | 1896 | Scotland for Ever! or, The Adventures of Alexander McDonell, etc. Also called The Gallant Gordons | | London: Routledge & Sons | Yes |

The Tar-bucket and Pipe-clay first appeared as a serial in Young England, starting in January 1890. Little Folks ran a serial starting in 1895 called "True to his Colours" by Groves.

=== Military history ===
Military Histories by John Percy Groves
| Year | Title | Illustrated by | Publisher | BL Cat. |
|---|---|---|---|---|
| 1887 | The 66th Berkshire regiment. A brief history of its services at home and abroad, from 1758 to 1881. Compiled from the regimental records, and other MSS | One low quality uncredited Frontispiece | Reading: J. Beecroft. | Yes |
| 1892 | Some Notable Generals and their Notable Battles | Lieut.-Col. Marshman | London: Griffith & Farran | Yes |
| 1893 | History of the 42nd Royal Highlanders, The Black Watch, now the first battalion The Black Watch (Royal Highlanders): 1729–1893. Histories of the Scottish Regiments Book No. 1 | Harry Payne | Edinburgh: Johnston. | Yes |
| 1893 | History of the 2nd Dragoons - the Royal Scots Greys, "Second to None", 1678–1893. Illustrated Histories of the Scottish Regiments: Book No. 2 | Harry Payne | Edinburgh: W. & A. K. Johnston | Yes |
| 1893 | History of the 79th Queen's Own Cameron Highlanders, now the first battalion Queen's Own Cameron Highlanders ...: 1794-1893: Scottish Regiments Book 3 | Harry Payne | Edinburgh: Johnston. | Yes |
| 1893 | illustrated Histories of the Scottish Regiments | Harry Payne | Edinburgh: W. & A. K. Johnston | Yes |
| 1894 | History of the 91st Princess Louise's Argyllshire Highlanders, now the 1st Battalion Princess Louise's Argyll & Sutherland Highlanders ... 1794-1894 | Harry Payne | Edinburgh London: W. & A. K. Johnston. | Yes |
| 1895 | History of the 93rd Sutherland Highlanders, now the 2nd Battalion Princess Louise's Argyll and Sutherland Highlanders ... 1800-1895 | Harry Payne | Edinburgh London: W. & A. K. Johnston. | Yes |
| 1895 | The Royal Guernsey Militia: a brief sketch of its services, etc. from 800 to 1895. In two volumes. | Vol II shows uniforms | Guernsey: Frederick Clarke, States Arcade | No |
| 1895 | History of the 21st Royal Scots Fusiliers (formerly the 21st Royal North British Fusiliers) now known as the Royal Scots Fusiliers, 1678–1895. | | Edinburgh: W. & A. K. Johnston | Yes |
| 1904 | Historical Records of the 7th or Royal Regiment of Fusiliers now known as the Royal Fusiliers (the City of London Regiment), 1685–1903. | John Percy Groves | Guernsey: F. B. Guerin | Yes |

Grove also wrote or contributed to serial installments on military history, including Types of the British Army which ran as a column on regiments in The Graphic. The Graphic also produced coloured illustrations as supplements in a series called Types of the British Army and Navy. The illustrations were usually of particular regiments such as the 10th and 19th Hussars by John Charlton, but sometimes were of particular roles, such as A Captain of the Main-Top by W Christian Symonds.

=== Sources ===
The primary source for data on the books was the British Library. The lists indicate if the item was found in the British Library Catalogue (BL Cat.). Other sources included the COPAC database, publishers catalogues, newspaper reviews, and the used book trade.
