= Decoration of the Cross of Sanitary Merit =

Decoration of the Cross of Sanitary Merit Decorația Crucea Meritul Sanitar

Awarded by King of Romania
- Type: Chivalric state Decoration
- Religious affiliation: Romanian Orthodox
- Ribbon: White with thin Red lines at either side.
- Eligibility: Civil, Military
- Awarded for: Outstanding Donors, Writers or other acts and work that contributes to improving the health status of the country.
- Status: Abolished in 1947
- Sovereign: King Michael I of Romania
- Grades: Knight/Dame; Member

Precedence
- Next (higher): Decoration of the Cross of Queen Elisabeth
- Next (lower): Decoration of the Cross of The Danube
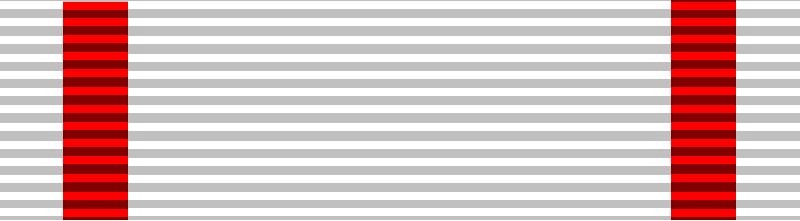
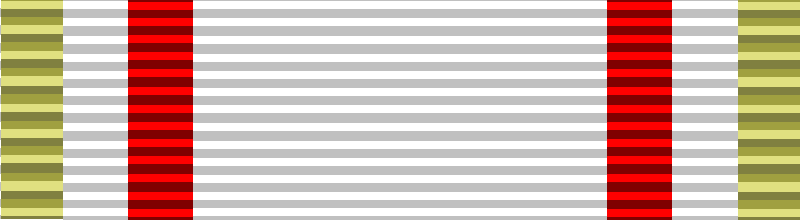
- Peacetime Wartime; The Ribbons of the Decoration

The Decoration of the Cross of Sanitary Merit (Romanian: Decorația Crucea Meritul Sanitar) was a Decoration established by King Carol I of Romania by Royal Decree 6471 on 25 November 1913 for his wife, Princess Elisabeth of Wied, to award Romanian men, women, and organisations deemed to be working outstandingly to improve the health status of the country.

The Decoration was abolished during the abolishment of the Romanian Monarchy in 1947 and wasn't reinstated as a Dynastic Decoration of the Decorations of the Romanian Royal House by Former King Michael I.
