= Harry Payne (artist) =

English military artist

- Born: March 5, 1858; London, England
- Died: March 21, 1927 (aged 69); Herne Bay, Kent, England
- Occupations: Artist, illustrator
- Known for: Military art and postcards
- Spouse: Susanna Terese Cossins
- Relatives: Arthur C. Payne (brother)

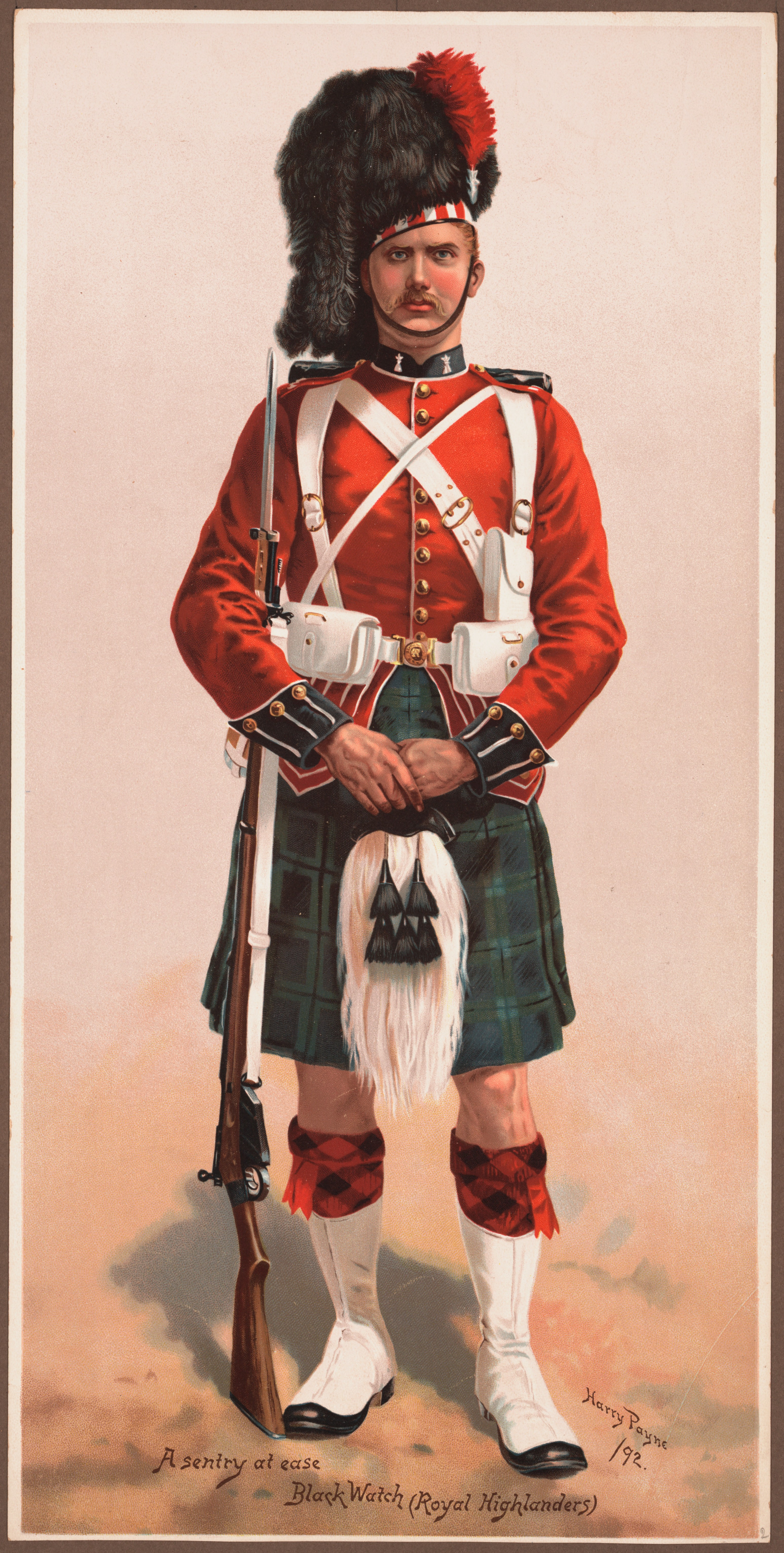
A Sentry at Ease, Black Watch (Royal Highlanders), a lithograph of a work by Harry Payne, 1892.

Harry Payne (8 May 1858 – 23 March 1927) was an English military artist.

== Biography ==
Henry Joseph Payne was born at Newington, London, the son of Joseph and Margaret Sophie Payne. His father was a solicitor's clerk. Harry Payne commenced his artistic career in the office of a merchant in Mincing Lane. After attending art school he worked as a designer to a firm of military contractors. By the 1880s he had become a prolific artist and illustrator, selling his artwork to the Prince of Wales and other members of the royal family. He worked on a number of commissions during the Golden Jubilee of Queen Victoria in 1887, including a book with his older brother, Arthur Charles Payne (1856–1933), the original sketches of which were presented to the Queen. In 1897 Payne worked on books and illustrations for the Diamond Jubilee and the Prince and Princess of Wales.

He married Susanna Terese Cossins at Camberwell on 16 June 1887, and they had no children.

With his brother Arthur Payne he produced many series of oilette postcards for Raphael Tuck & Sons and also did extensive work for Gale and Polden producing illustrations for their postcard series along with other military artists including Edgar Alfred Holloway, John McNeill, and Ernest Ibbetson.

In 1898, he and his brother Arthur created a series of chromolithographic and lithographic illustrations for an edition of Robert Browning's The Pied Piper of Hamelin.

Harry Payne lived in Forest Hill in Kent where he was a part-time volunteer soldier, serving with the Queen's Own West Kent Yeomanry. In 1905 he received the Imperial Yeomanry Long Service Medal, he was then having the rank of sergeant.

== Legacy ==
His 1901 painting of the Royal Horse Guards crossing Horse Guards Parade was sold at Bonhams in 2007 for over £50,000.

== Gallery ==
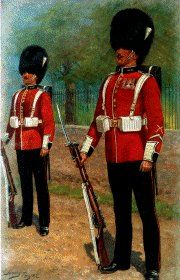
Welsh Guards

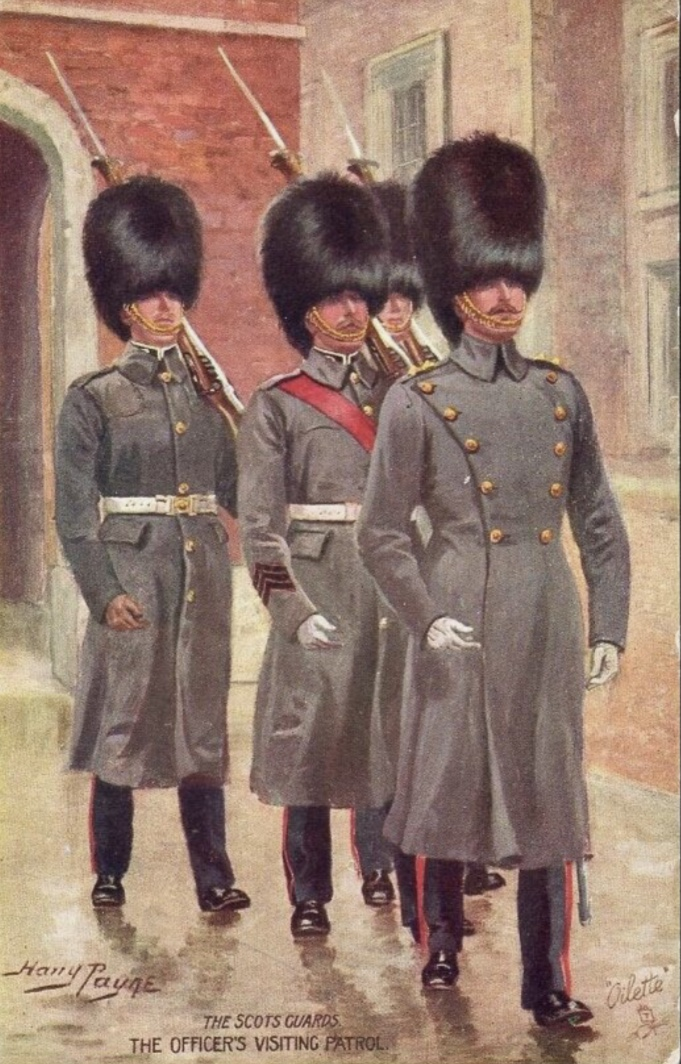
Scots Guards

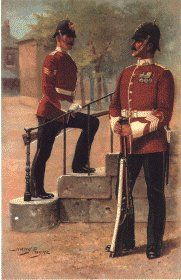
The Manchester Regiment in the 1880s

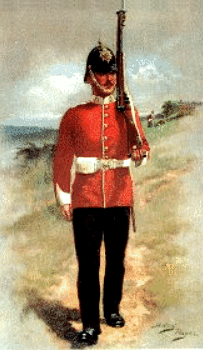
Private of the East Lancashire Regiment in pre-1914

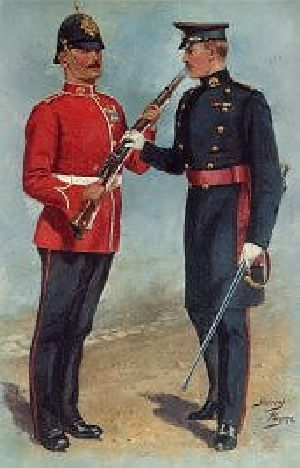
The Duke of Wellington's Regiment in the 1880s

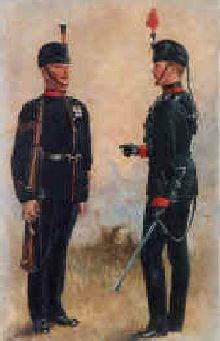
The King's Royal Rifle Corps

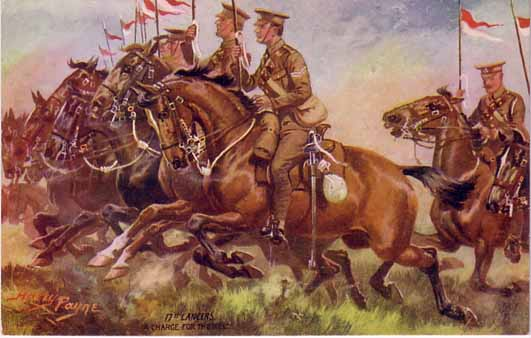
The 17th Lancers advancing

Changing Sentries outside Buckingham Palace: The Coldstreams relieving the Grenadiers
