= Austerlitz =

Austerlitz may refer to:

== History ==
- Battle of Austerlitz, an 1805 victory by the French Grand Army of Napoleon Bonaparte

== Places ==
- Austerlitz, German name for Slavkov u Brna in the Czech Republic, which gave its name to the Battle of Austerlitz and is the namesake of other places
  - Austerlitz, Netherlands
  - Austerlitz, Kentucky, United States
  - Austerlitz, New York, United States
  - Austerlitz (Oscar, Louisiana), a plantation house listed on the NRHP in Louisiana, US
  - Gare d'Austerlitz, railway station in Paris, France

== People ==
- Austerlitz (family), Jewish toponymic surname shared by several unrelated families
  - Fred Astaire (1899–1987), born Frederick Austerlitz
  - Robert Austerlitz (1923–1994), linguist, specialist in the Proto-Finno-Ugric language

== Culture ==
- Austerlitz (1960 film) directed by Abel Gance
- Austerlitz (2016 film), a documentary film
- Austerlitz (novel) by W. G. Sebald, 2001
- "Austerlitz", a song by The Jezabels on the album Prisoner, 2011
- Austerlitz (video game), a turn-based strategy video game
- Austerlitz (1972 board wargame), a 1973 board wargame by SPI based on the battle
- Austerlitz (1993 board wargame), a 1993 board wargame by The Gamers based on the battle
- Austerlitz (play-by-email game), published by Supersonic Games
- "Austerlitz" (Succession), an episode of the television show Succession
