= Zeist (municipality) =

- Municipality
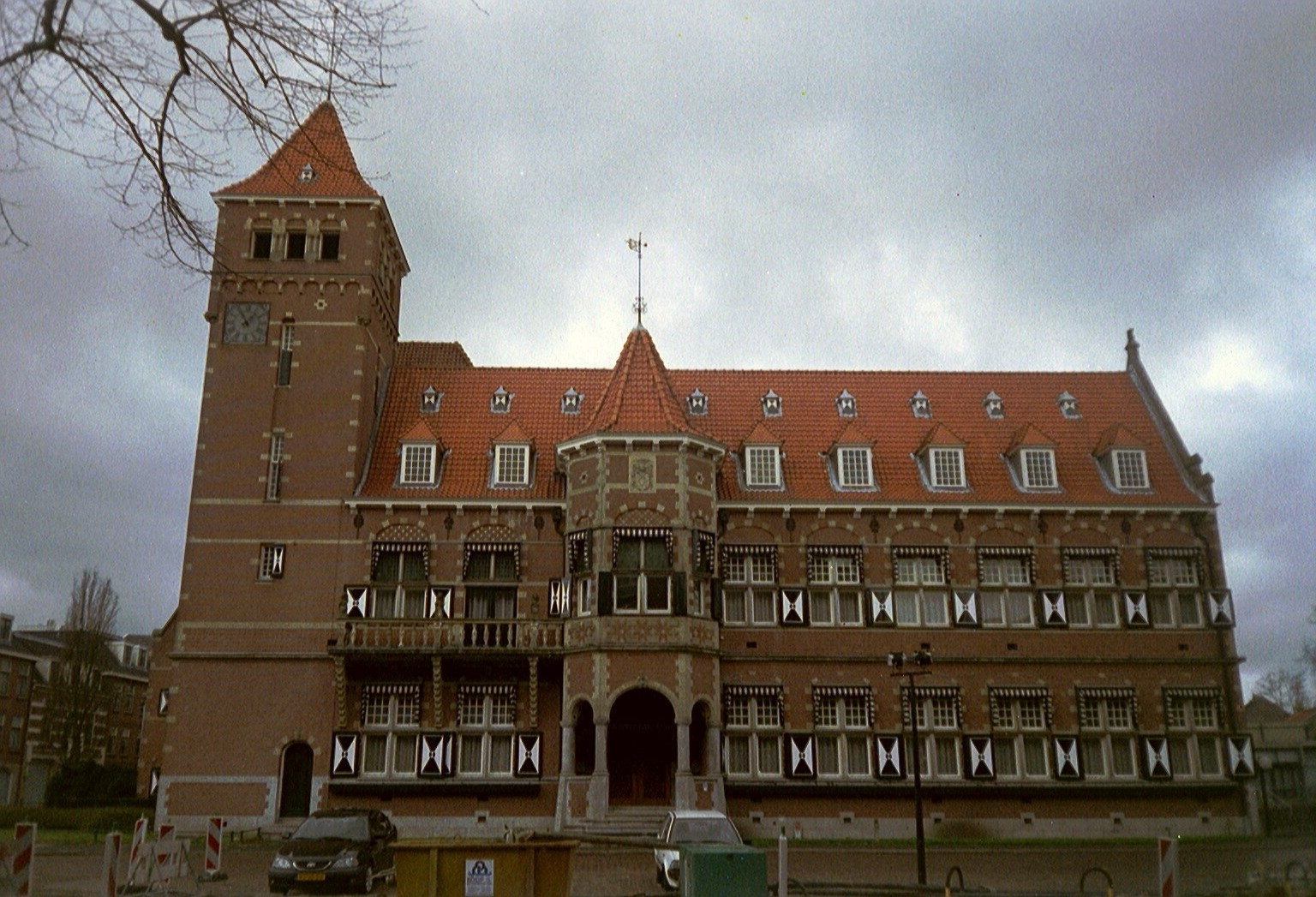
- Municipal hall

- Flag Coat of arms

- Location in Utrecht
- Coordinates: 52°6′53″N 5°15′45″E
- Country: Netherlands
- Province: Utrecht

Government
  - Body: Municipal council
  - Mayor: J. Langenacker (PvdA)
  - Municipal Secretary: R. Grotens
  - Deputy Mayor: L.H.H. Hoogstraten (GL)

Area
  - Total: 48.65 km^{2} (18.78 sq mi)
  - Land: 48.51 km^{2} (18.73 sq mi)
  - Water: 0.14 km^{2} (0.054 sq mi)
- Elevation: 4 m (13 ft)

Population (January 1, 2022)
  - Total: 65,043
  - Density: 1,341/km^{2} (3,473/sq mi)
- Demonym: Zeistenaar
- Time zone: UTC+1 (CET)
  - Summer (DST): UTC+2 (CEST)
- Postcode: 3700–3712, 3734–3735
- Area code: 030
- Website: www.zeist.nl

Zeist (Dutch pronunciation: [ˈzɛist]) is a municipality in the Utrecht province of the Netherlands.

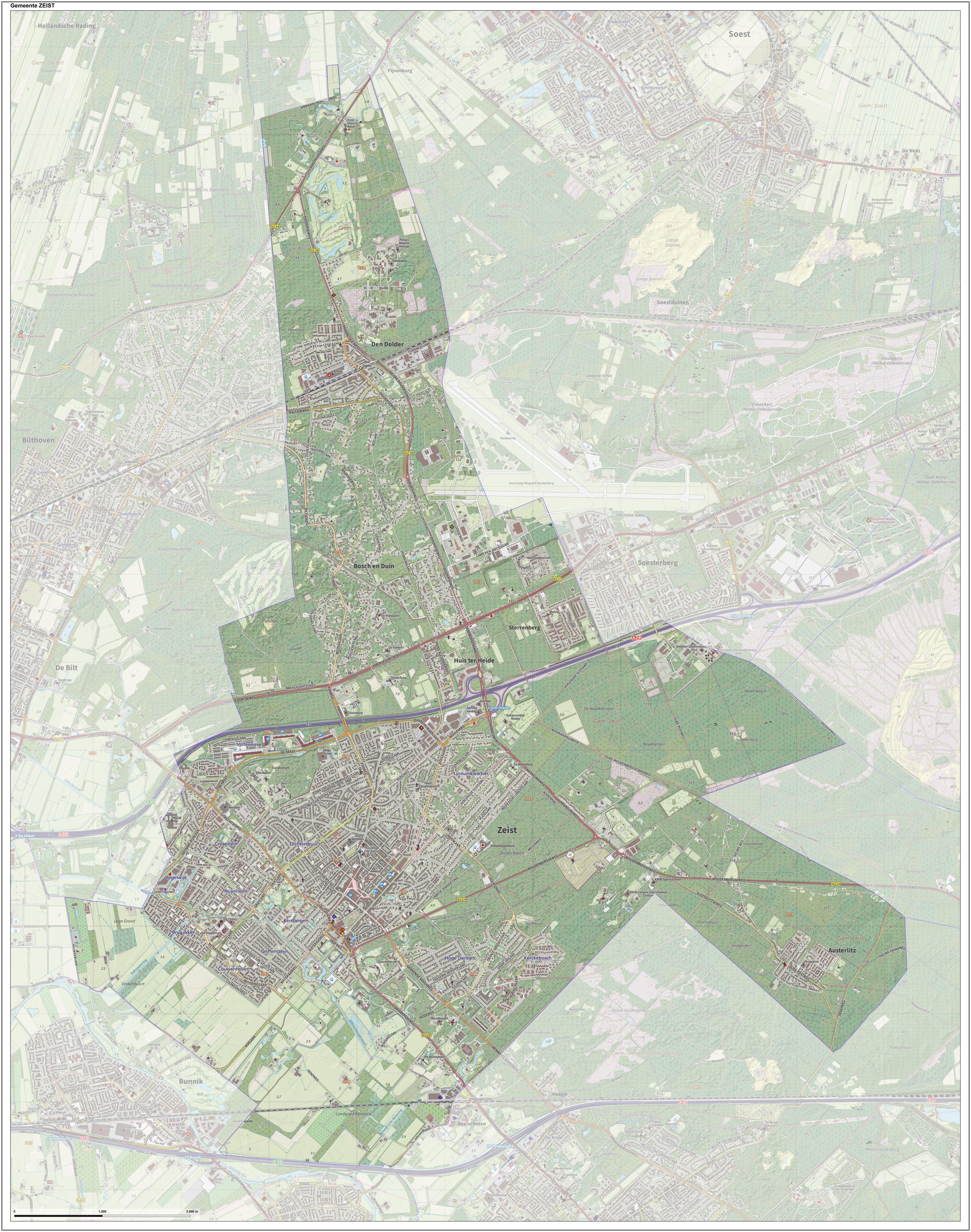
Dutch Topographic map of Zeist (municipality), Sept. 2014

== Population centers ==
- Zeist (seat)
- Austerlitz
- Bosch en Duin
- Den Dolder
- Huis ter Heide
- Sterrenberg

== Neighboring municipalities ==
- De Bilt (municipality)
- Amersfoort (municipality)
- Baarn (municipality)
- Bunnik (municipality)
- Soest (municipality)
- Leusden (municipality)
- Utrecht (municipality)
- Utrechtse Heuvelrug (municipality)
- Woudenberg (municipality)

== See also ==
- Zeist
- Utrecht
- Utrecht (province)
- Utrecht (municipality)
