= Stolpersteine in Mikulov, Slavkov u Brna and Znojmo =

Memorial installations in Czech Republic

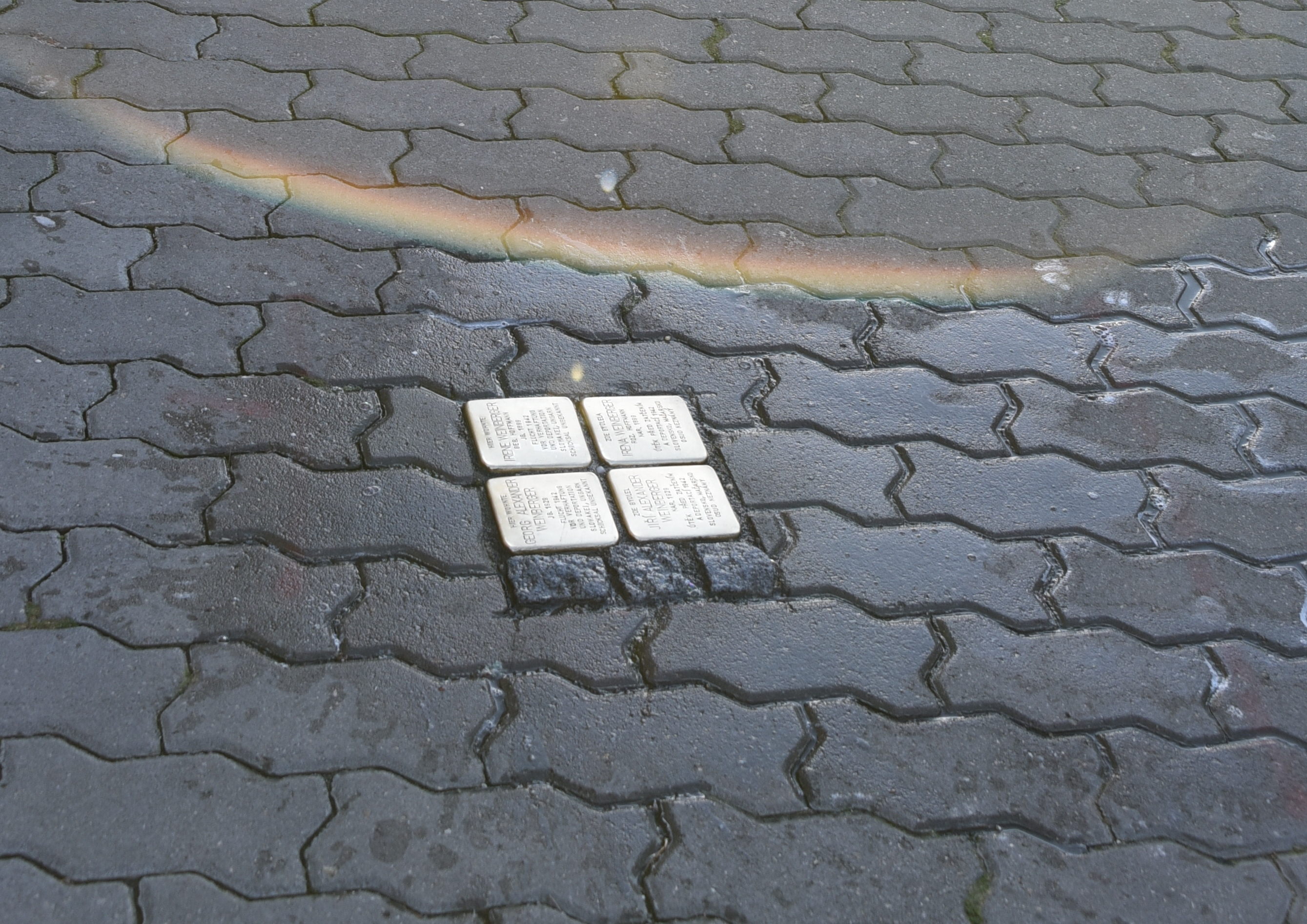
The four Stolpersteine of Znojmo, dedicated to Georg Alexander and Irene Weinberger

This article lists the Stolpersteine in three towns of the South Moravian Region (Czech: Jihomoravský kraj). Stolpersteine is the German name for stumbling blocks collocated all over Europe by German artist Gunter Demnig. They remember the fate of the Nazi victims being murdered, deported, exiled or driven to suicide.

Generally, the stumbling blocks are posed in front of the building where the victims had their last self chosen residence. The name of the Stolpersteine in Czech is: Kameny zmizelých, stones of the disappeared.

The lists are sortable; the basic order follows the alphabet according to the last name of the victim.

== Mikulov ==
Stone	Inscription	Location	Life and death
	HERE LIVED; HANA HLAVENKOVÁ; NÉE PISKOVÁ; BORN 1925; DEPORTED 1942; TO THERESIENSTADT; TO AUSCHWITZ; 1945 DEATH MARCH; TO BERGEN-BELSEN; SURVIVED	Koněvova 42; 48°48′22″N 16°38′29″E	Hana Hlavenková née Pisková, also Johana Anna, was born on 13 May 1925. She was the daughter of Hilda Pisková and Otto Pisa as well as the grand daughter of Anna Pisková. She had a twin brother named Paul. She survived the concentration camps of Theresienstadt and Auschwitz as well as the death march in the winter of 1945 to Bergen-Belsen. Her grandmother was deported to the Warsaw Ghetto in 1942, and her mother was taken to Auschwitz-Birkenau concentration camp in 1944. Both were murdered by the Nazi regime. In 1947, her son, Lubomír Hlavenka, was born. He came back to his hometown after 37 years for the collocation of the Stolpersteine for his mother, his grandmother and his great grandmother. He recalled that the family had been anchored in Mikulov since at least 1648. From this year stems the death certificate of his ancestor Jakob Pisa.
	HERE LIVED; ANNA PISKOVÁ; NÉE KARPELESOVÁ; BORN 1868; DEPORTED 1942; TO THERESIENSTADT; MURDERED 1944; IN WARSAW	Husova 84/9; 48°48′28″N 16°38′10″E	Anna Pisková née Karpelesová as born on 15 May 1868. Her husband ran a brickyard. She had at least one son, Otto, who took the legacy of his father. Her last residence before deportation was in Brno. She was deported on 29 March 1942 with transport Ae to Theresienstadt. Her transport number was 814. On 24 April 1942, she was transferred to the Warsaw Ghetto with transport An. Her transport number was 102. Of 1,000 people of this transport only eleven survived. Anna Pisková was one of the victims of the mass murder.
	HERE LIVED; HILDA PISKOVÁ; NÉE PASCHKEOVÁ; BORN 1898; DEPORTED 1942; TO THERESIENSTADT; MURDERED 1944; IN AUSCHWITZ	Koněvova 42; 48°48′22″N 16°38′29″E	Hilda Pisková née Paschkeová was born on 2 February 1898. She was married to Otto Piska, the owner of a brickyard. The couple got twins in 1925, daughter Hana and son Paul. Hilda Pisková's last residence before deportation was in Brno. She was deported to Theresienstadt concentration camp on 27 May 1942 with transport AAa. Her transport number was 45. On 16 October 1944, she was transferred to Auschwitz concentration camp. Her transport number was 1145. There she was assassinated by the Nazi regime. Her mother also died in the course of the Shoah. Her daughter Hana, however, was able to survive concentration camps and todermask, and in 1947 she received a son, Lubomír Hlavenka, who in 2012 ordered the stumbling blocks for mother, grandmother and great grandmother. The latter regretted that he did not have the means to order Stolpersteine also for all other 400 victims from Mikulov.

== Slavkov u Brna ==
Stone	Inscription	Location	Life and death
	HERE LIVED; EMIL STRACH; BORN 1884; DEPORTED 1942; TO THERESIENSTADT; MURDERED 1942; IN IZBICA	Palackého náměstí 77; 49°09′08″N 16°52′38″E	Emil Strach was born in 1884 as son of Josef Strach and Rosa Strach née Singer. He had three sisters and one brother: Hermione Hönigsfeld (1878-1944), Louise Prager (1879-1940), Rudolf Strach (1886-1914) and Therese Strach (1887-1890). His wife Sidonie Strach née Huss (1888-1931) died in a traffic accident in Switzerland. The couple had a son, Otmar Strach. Emil Strach was deported on 4 April 1942 with transport Ah from Brno to Theresienstadt concentration camp. His transport number was 459. On 27 April 1942, he was deported Izbica Ghetto by transport Aq. Of 999 deportees of this transport, 997 were murdered by the Nazi regime, including No. 591 Emil Strach. Son Otmar Strach survived, became a gynecologist, married and became father of three children.

== Znojmo ==
Before the attack of the Nazi regime in 1938, there lived about 700 Jews in Znojmo, about 2.5 percent of the population. The small Jewish community had grown from 357 persons in 1869 to 749 in 1921. The Jews were well integrated, they had their own synagogue and a small cemetery built in 1868 north of the town on the Kühberg. In the so-called Reichspogromnacht on 9 November 1938, the synagogue was burnt down by the German National Socialists. In 1940 the remaining remains of the synagogue were demolished.

In the case of the Weinberger family, two stumbling blocks were laid for each victim, one in Czech and one in German.

Stone	Inscription	Location	Life and death
	HERE LIVED; GEORG ALEXANDER; WEINBERGER; BORN 1929; ESCAPED 1942; FROM ARREST; AND DEPORTATION; SLOVAKIA, HUNGARY; FATE UNKNOWN	Rudoleckého 859/21; 48°51′11″N 16°03′25″E	Georg Alexander Weinberger was born on 22 January 1929 in Vienna. He came from a well-to-do industrial family in Znojmo and was the only son of Fritz Alexander Weinberger and Irene Weinberge née Hoffmann. His father died already in 1932, when Georg Alexander was just three years old. His grandfather and grandmother, his aunts and his uncle escaped the persecution by the Nazi regime and fled in time, most of the family members to New York. It is unclear why Irene Weinberger and her son remained in the now battered Czechoslovakia. At first they hid in Prague. In 1942, his mother and he tried to escape imminent arrest and deportation and tried to reach Hungary via Slovakia. His fate and the fate of his mother remains unknown. After 1945 both were declared dead.
	HERE LIVED; IRENA WEINBERGER; NÉE HOFFMANN; BORN 1899; ESCAPED 1942; FROM ARREST; AND DEPORTATION; SLOVAKIA, HUNGARY; FATE UNKNOWN	Rudoleckého 859/21; 48°51′11″N 16°03′25″E	Irene Weinberger née Hoffmann, Czech: Irena, was born in Budapest on 13 April 1899. She was married to Fritz Alexander Weinberger, born on 16 March 1898 in Znojmo, the oldest son of Znojmo industrialist Alfred Weinberger. Her father-in-law built two prestigious residences in today's Rudoleckého. One of them, a neoclassical villa designed by Brno architect Norbert Troller and with interiors of Viennese architect Armand Weiser, was erected for the young couple. Irene and Fritz Alexander Weinberger had a son, Georg Alexander, born in 1929 in Vienna. Irene's husband, however, died already on 15 March 1932 in Znojmo. After the German annexation and destruction of Czechoslovakia, most of the family members escaped to the United States, including her father-in-law and his second wife, Fanny. Irene Weinberger first hid with her son in Prague. "Before the deportation to Theresienstadt they tried to escape through Slovakia and further to Hungary, but their traces end in 1942 and after the war they were declared dead."

== Dates of collocations ==
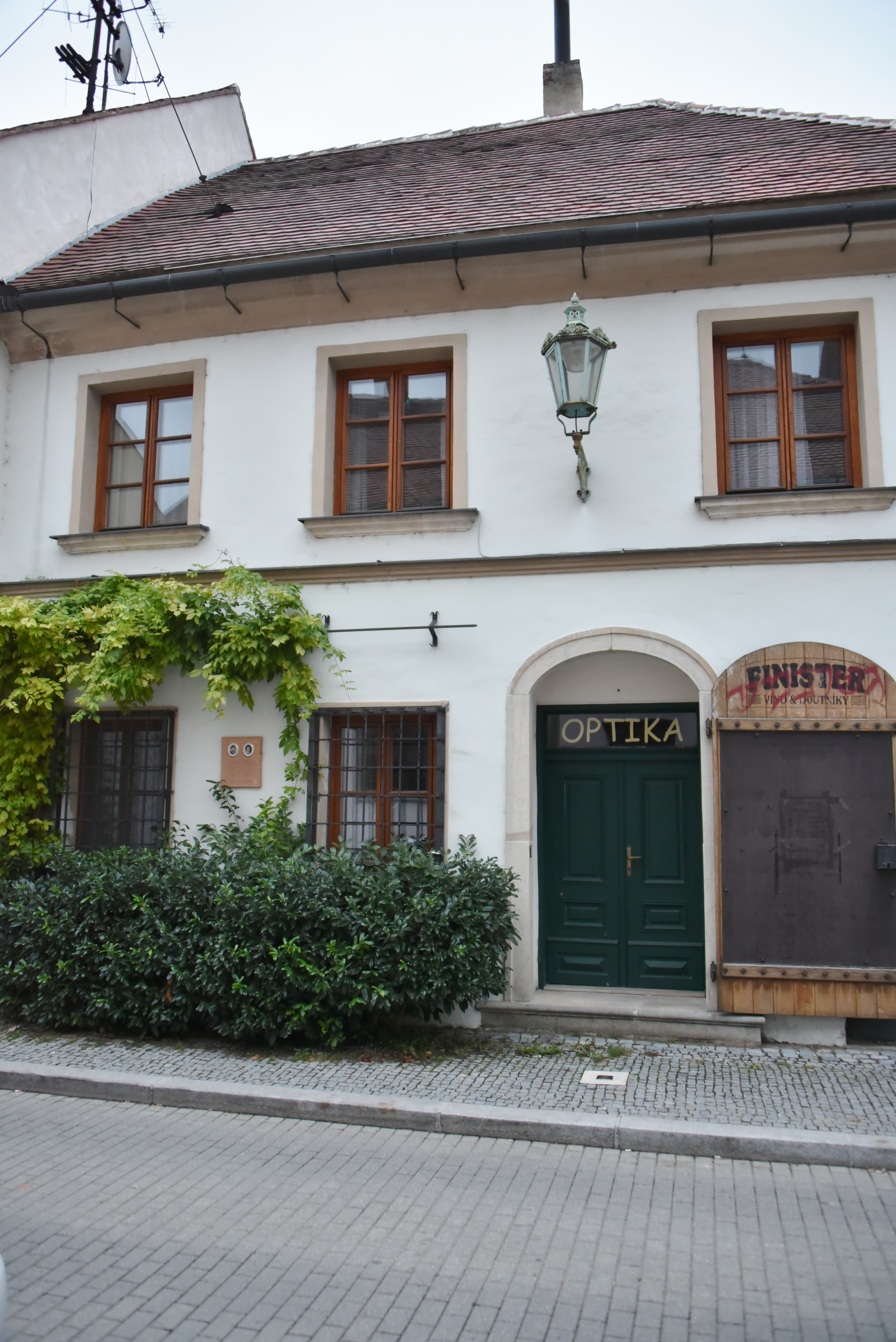
Stolperstein for Anna Pisková in Mikulov

The Stolpersteine in the three towns were collocated by the artist himself on the following dates:

- 30 October 2012: Mikulov
- 15. September 2014: Slavkov u Brna
- 4. August 2016: Znojmo

The Czech Stolperstein project was initiated in 2008 by the Česká unie židovské mládeže (Czech Union of Jewish Youth) and was realized with the patronage of the Mayor of Prague.

== See also ==
- List of places with Stolpersteine
- Stolpersteine in the Czech Republic
