= Obdržálek =

Obdržálek (pronounced [ˈobdr̩.ʒaːlɛk]) is a Czech surname. Notable people with the surname include:

- Peregrin Obdržálek (1825–1891), Catholic priest and author
- Petr Obdržálek (born 1986), Czech ice hockey player
