= Austerlitz (family) =

Austerlitz family
- Family
- Etymology: Named after Austerlitz (Slavkov), Moravia
- Place of origin: Austerlitz (Slavkov), Moravia
- Members: Aaron b. Meïr Austerlitz; Baruch b. Solomon Austerlitz; Hirschel Austerlitz; Mayer Austerlitz; Moses b. Joseph Austerlitz; Samuel b. Simon Austerlitz; Friedrich Emanuel Austerlitz; Fred Austerlitz (Fred Astaire)

Austerlitz is the name of a Jewish family. As is the case with all names derived from places, the surname "Austerlitz" does not necessarily signify that all the persons so named belong to one family. The name originated in Austerlitz (Slavkov), Moravia.

It denotes that an ancestor of the person came from that place or was for some time a resident there. In the tombstone inscriptions of the old cemetery at Prague this name occurs after 1620. The name is also found in Prague among those Jews banished from Vienna in 1670, and in other localities in Austria and Hungary. Of the members of this family known in literature and communal life, the following may be mentioned:

- Aaron b. Meïr Austerlitz, secretary to the rabbinate of Berlin, 1775.
- Baruch b. Solomon Austerlitz, rabbi in Cologne and preacher at Prague at the beginning of the eighteenth century; grandson of Baruch, an exile from Vienna. He was son-in-law of Samuel Tausk, or Taussig, primator (president of the congregation) of Prague. He wrote approbations (haskamot) to an edition of the Midrash Rabba printed at Frankfort-on-the-Oder, 1705, and to the 'Arukh ha-Ḳaẓer, Prague, 1707. One of his sermons was published in Prague, 1713.
- Hirschel Austerlitz, a communal leader exiled from Vienna in 1670. In 1675 he, together with Hirz Coma, Max Schlesinger, Solomon Wolf, and Solomon Auspitz, signed a petition to Emperor Leopold I, praying that the Jews might be allowed to resettle in Vienna.
- Mayer Austerlitz, rabbi in Eperies, Hungary; was one of Hildesheimer's earliest pupils.
- Moses b. Joseph Austerlitz, a scholar and promoter of Jewish learning; lived in Vienna, but when the Jews were expelled from that city and from Lower Austria (1669), he removed to Nikolsburg, Moravia. His house was the resort of scholars, especially after the fire of Prague in 1689.
- Samuel b. Simon Austerlitz, rabbi in Miskolc, Hungary. He was born 1870 in Vienna, studied in Pressburg under Rabbi Simcha Bunim Sofer and was until 1896 rabbi of the temple club "Am Volkert", which later established "Pazmanitentempel" in Vienna's second district Leopoldstadt. After rabbinical positions in Pápa and Somorja, he was appointed 1914 chief rabbi of Miskolc and where he remained till his death in 1938. He was married to the daughter of Rabbi Moshe Aryeh Roth, chief rabbi of Pápa.
- Friedrich Emanuel Austerlitz, later known as Frederic "Fritz" Austerlitz, born September 8, 1868, in Linz, Austria, to Jewish parents who had converted to Roman Catholicism. He emigrated to the United States. On May 10, 1899, at Omaha, Nebraska, was born his son Fred Austerlitz - who would later change his name and get world-wide fame as the dancer Fred Astaire.
