= František Koláček =

Czech physicist

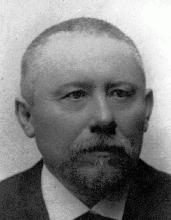
František Koláček

František Koláček (9 October 1851, Slavkov u Brna, Moravia – 8 December 1913, Prague) was a Czech physicist.

Koláček studied at the German gymnasium in Brno (finished in 1868), then at the technical universities in Prague and Vienna. At the Charles University in Prague, under guidance of Ernst Mach, he obtained the doctoral decree in 1877. He worked as a teacher at the gymnasium in Brno (1 year) and then in Prague (18 years). Only in 1891 was he named professor of mathematical physics at Charles university. During 1900 - 1902 he worked as a professor at the university in Brno but then returned to Prague.

Koláček worked in the fields of hydrodynamics, thermodynamics, optics and electromagnetic theory of light. He was the first one to describe the electromagnetic theory of light dispersion.
