= Slavkov u Brna =

Town in South Moravian Region, Czech Republic

- Town
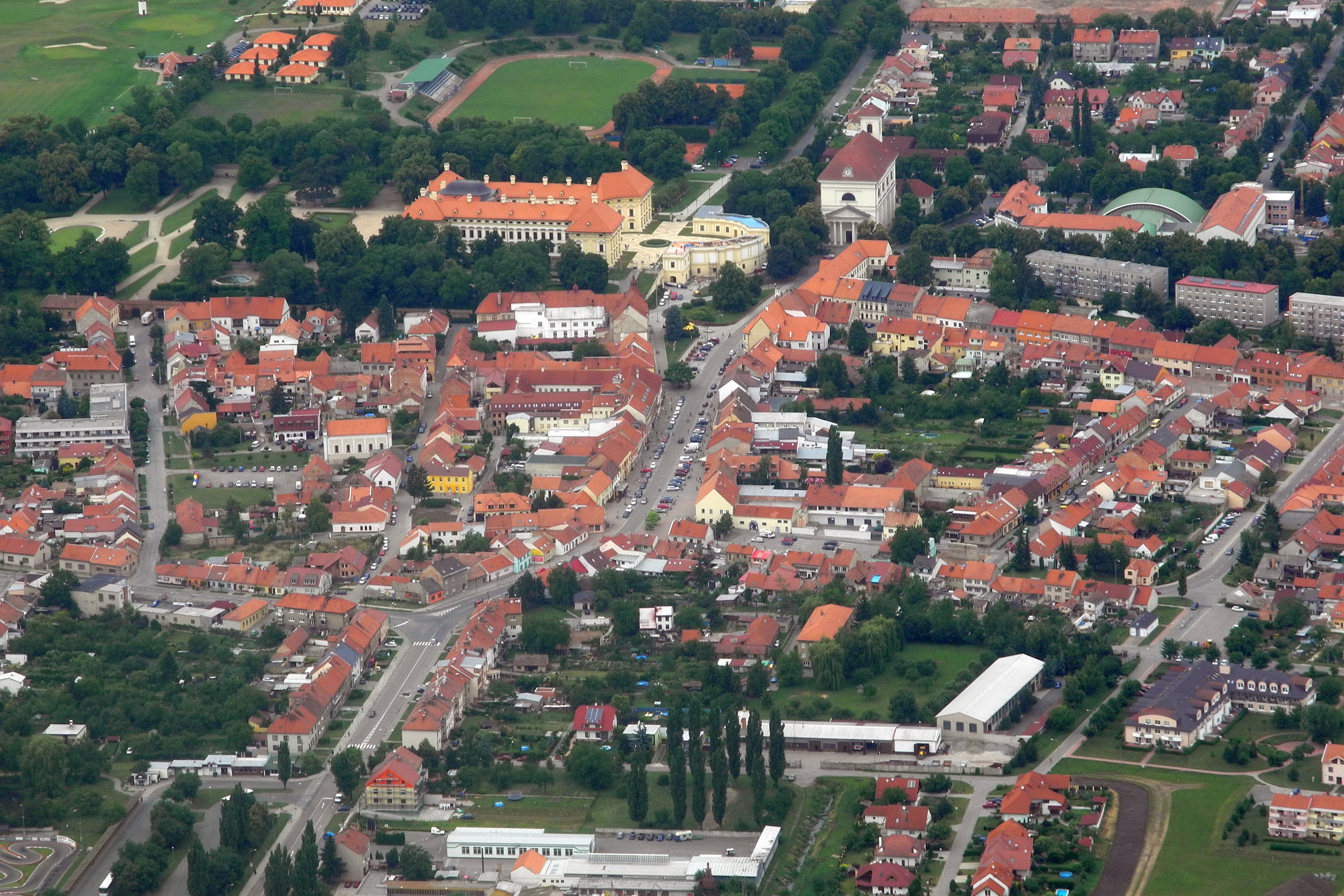
- Aerial view

- Flag Coat of arms

- Location in the Czech Republic
- Coordinates: 49°9′12″N 16°52′35″E
- Country: Czech Republic
- Region: South Moravian
- District: Vyškov
- First mentioned: 1237

Government
  - Mayor: Michal Boudný

Area
  - Total: 14.95 km^{2} (5.77 sq mi)
- Elevation: 211 m (692 ft)

Population (2026-01-01)
  - Total: 7,294
  - Density: 487.9/km^{2} (1,264/sq mi)
- Time zone: UTC+1 (CET)
  - Summer (DST): UTC+2 (CEST)
- Postal code: 684 01
- Website: www.slavkov.cz

Slavkov u Brna (Czech pronunciation: [ˈslafkof ˈu br̩na]; German: Austerlitz) is a town in Vyškov District in the South Moravian Region of the Czech Republic. It has about 7,300 inhabitants. The town is located on the Litava River, on the border of the Litenčice Hills, Dyje–Svratka Valley and Ždánice Forest.

Slavkov u Brna became a town in 1416. The town gave its name to the Battle of Austerlitz, which took place several kilometres west. The historic town centre is well preserved and is protected as an urban monument zone. The main landmark of the town is the Slavkov Castle.

== Etymology ==
The German name Austerlitz (and the former Czech name Novosedlice) is derived from Latin Nova sedes ('new settlement'), which has gradually evolved over history through the names Novosedeliz (1237), Nausedlicz (1322), Neusserlicz (1343), Nausterlitz (1460) and Austerlitz (1611). The current Czech name Slavkov is derived from the name Slávek (a colloquial name for Bohuslav), who probably owned a manor house here. This name was first documented in 1361. In 1918, Slavkov was renamed Slavkov u Brna ('Slavkov near Brno') to distinguish from other places with the same name.

== Geography ==
Slavkov u Brna is located about 16 kilometres (10 mi) east of Brno. It is situated on the border of three geomorphological regions: the northeastern part of the municipal territory lies in the Litenčice Hills, the northwestern part lies in the Dyje–Svratka Valley and the southern part extends into the Ždánice Forest. The highest point is Slavkov-kaple-sv-urbana3.jpg|Chapel of Saint Urban at 361 m (1,184 ft) above sea level. The Litava River flows through the town.

== History ==
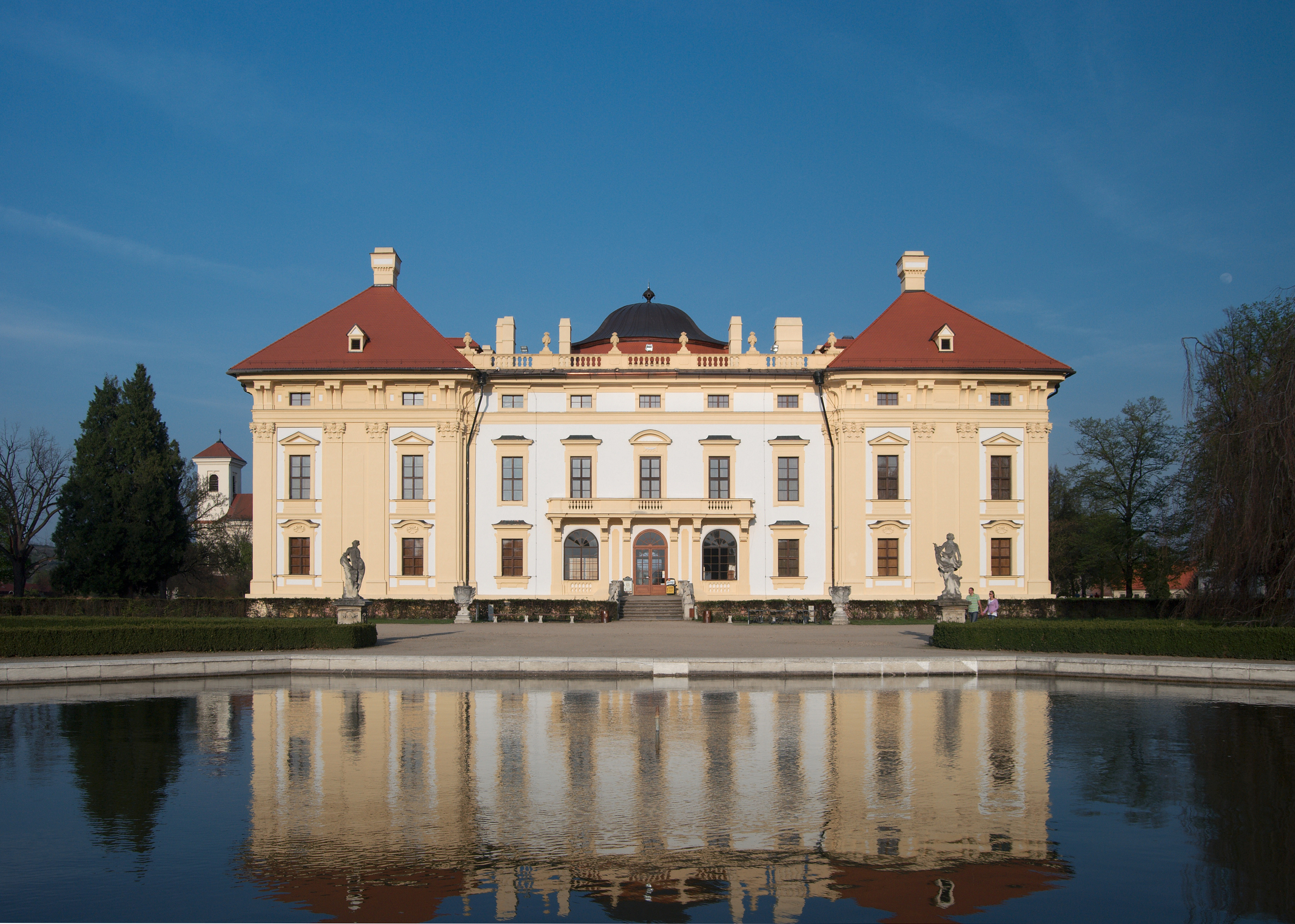
Slavkov Castle

At the end of the 12th century, Margrave Vladislaus III gave the area to the Teutonic Order. The first written mention of Slavkov is in a deed of King Wenceslaus I from 1237. It was originally a market village with a fortified stronghold and a church, located at the crossroads of trade routes. The Teutonic Order founded a commandery here.

From 1396 to 1407, Slavkov was held by Jobst of Moravia. In 1407, it was returned to the Teutonic Order, but after the defeat of the Order in the Battle of Grunwald, Slavkov was confiscated from them in 1411.

In the 14th century, a Jewish ghetto was established near the commandery. The merger of the Christian and Jewish communities created a strong economic agglomeration, which was promoted to a town by King Wenceslaus IV in 1416. The town was strongly fortified and had four gates.

The town often changed owners until 1509, when the noble family of Kaunitz assumed control for more than 400 years. They made it the main seat of the family.

The Battle of Austerlitz between the First French Empire and the Austrian and Russian forces took place near the town and was named after the town. In the historic salon of Slavkov Castle, an armistice was signed between France and Austria after the battle on 2 December 1805.

== Demographics ==
Historical population

Year	Pop.	±%
1869	3,305	—
1880	3,487	+5.5%
1890	3,919	+12.4%
1900	3,703	−5.5%
1910	4,123	+11.3%

Year	Pop.	±%
1921	4,231	+2.6%
1930	4,554	+7.6%
1950	4,445	−2.4%
1961	4,747	+6.8%
1970	5,001	+5.4%

Year	Pop.	±%
1980	5,609	+12.2%
1991	5,890	+5.0%
2001	5,881	−0.2%
2011	6,207	+5.5%
2021	7,073	+14.0%

Source: Censuses

== Transport ==
The I/50 road (part of the European route E50), which connects the D1 motorway near Brno with Uherské Hradiště and the Czech–Slovak border, runs through the town.

Slavkov u Brna is located on the railway line Brno–Uherské Hradiště.

== Sights ==
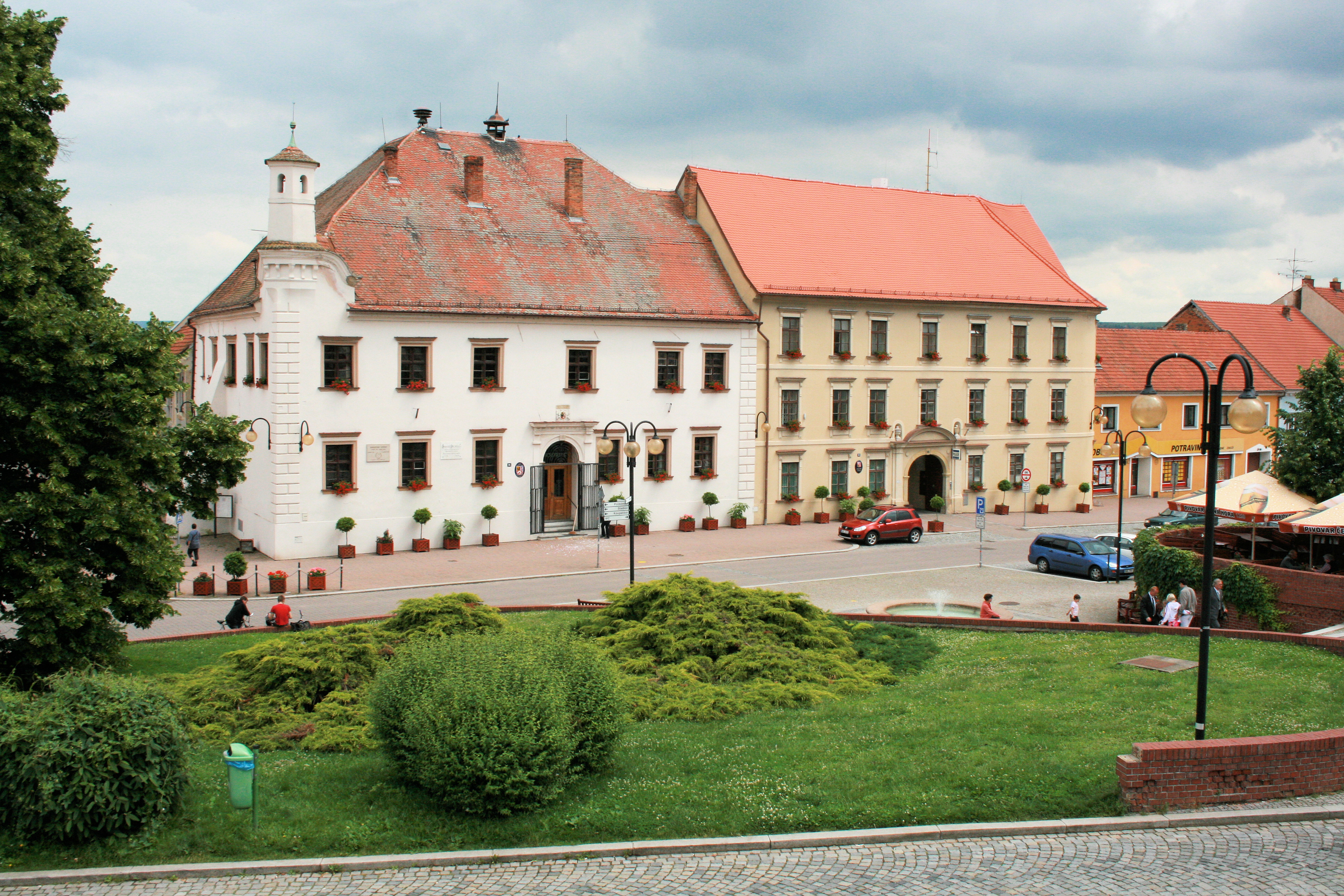
Town hall and the police station on the town square

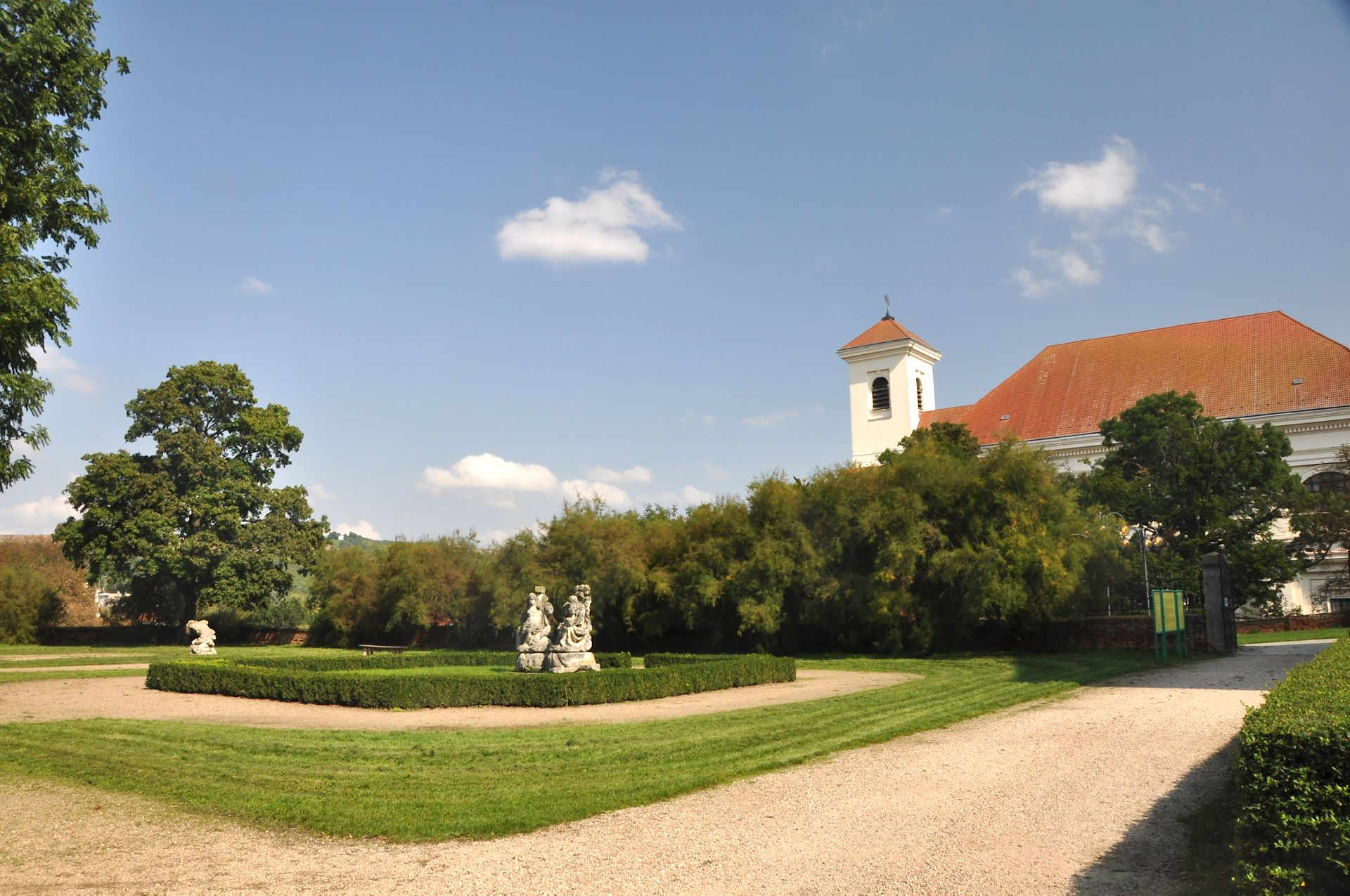
Church of the Resurrection of the Lord behind the castle garden

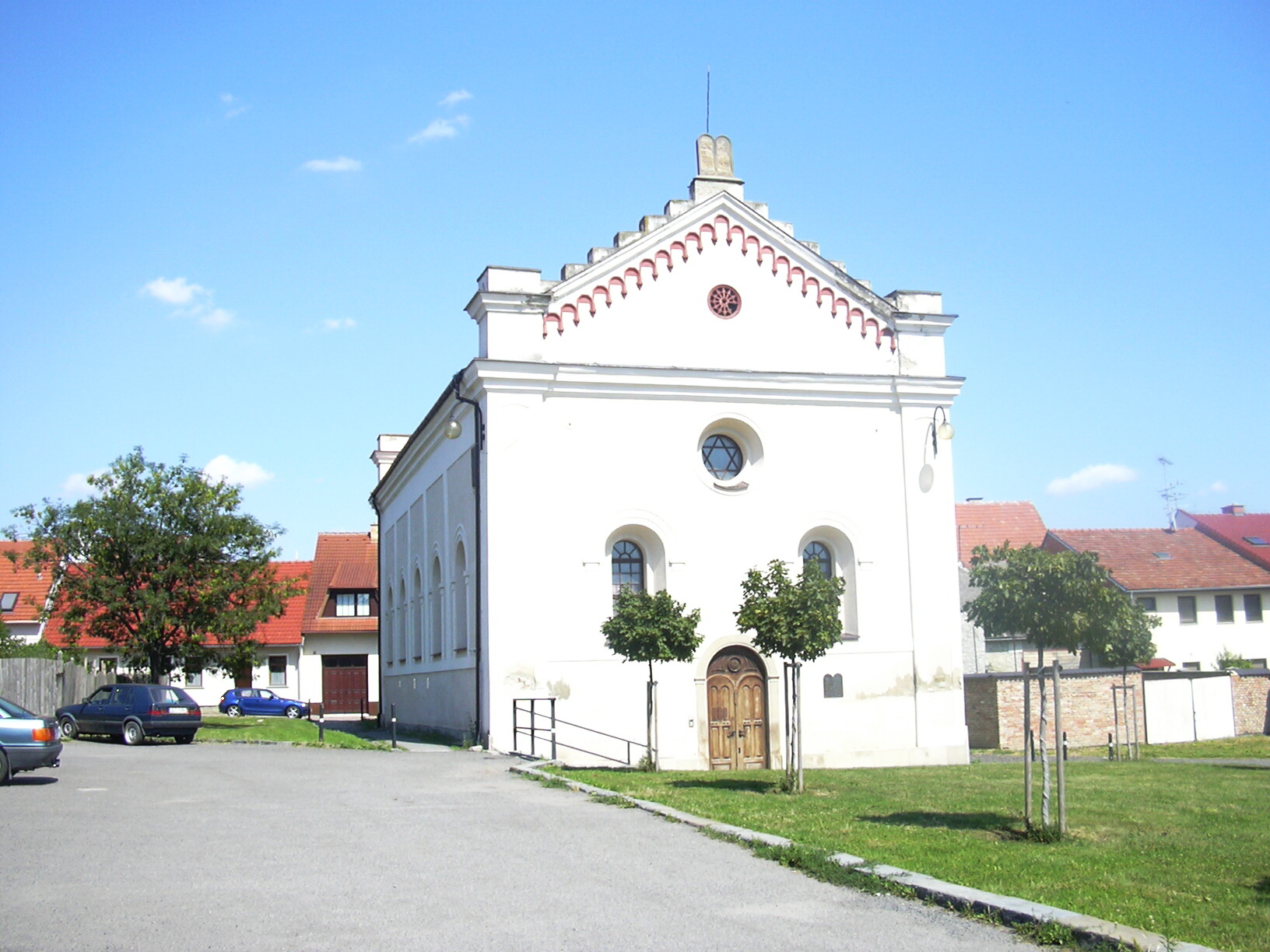
Synagogue

On the site of the old fortress was built a Renaissance residence at the end of the 16th century. The Slavkov Castle was rebuilt to the current Baroque form by Italian architect Domenico Martinelli in the 1680s. It belongs to the oldest preserved noble residences in Moravia. There is a small museum and a multimedia presentation about the Battle of Austerlitz. The castle includes a French formal garden, part of which was simplified into an English park.

The main landmarks of the town square are the late Renaissance town hall from 1592 and a mansion. Remains of the town walls from the 14th and 15th centuries have been preserved to this day. They are about 4 metres (13 ft) high.

The Church of the Resurrection of the Lord is a late Baroque and Neoclassical building, built in 1786–1789. It has three pulpits. The church was designed by Johann Ferdinand Hetzendorf of Hohenberg.

The Chapel of Saint John the Baptist is a cemetery chapel, located on the site of a hospital from the 13th century. Its current appearance is from 1743. Beneath the chapel is a vault with the Kaunitz family tomb.

Chapel of Saint Urban on the hill Urban was built by design of Domenico Martinelli in 1712. It was badly damaged during the Battle of Austerlitz and had to be rebuilt in 1858–1861.

Only the Neo-Romanesque synagogue built in 1858 remains from the Jewish ghetto. There is also a Jewish cemetery, founded in 1744. It consists of about 300 tombstones. The oldest preserved tombstones, which were transferred there from an older cemetery, date from 1735 and 1736.

== Legacy ==
Much in the same way that in London, the English have named Waterloo Station to commemorate their victory at Waterloo, the French gave the name of Austerlitz to one of the major Parisian train stations, the Gare d'Austerlitz, the neighbouring bridge Pont d'Austerlitz, and the waterfront Quai d'Austerlitz. In the Netherlands, a village named Austerlitz was founded in commemoration of the battle, as was a small town of Austerlitz, New York.

== Notable people ==
- Abraham Aberle (1811–1841), poet and translator
- František Koláček (1851–1913), physicist
- Peregrin Obdržálek (1825–1891), Catholic priest, writer and humorist
- Lubomír Tesáček (1957–2011), athlete

Austerlitz is a Jewish family name, of which the bearers are nowadays spread worldwide but which indicate an ultimate family origin in the town. The dancer Fred Astaire was born Frederick Austerlitz, and thus it could be assumed that his ancestors lived in this town.

== Twin towns – sister cities ==
Slavkov u Brna is twinned with:

- Darney, France
- Horn, Austria
- Pag, Croatia
- Sławków, Poland
- Zeist, Netherlands

== Gallery ==
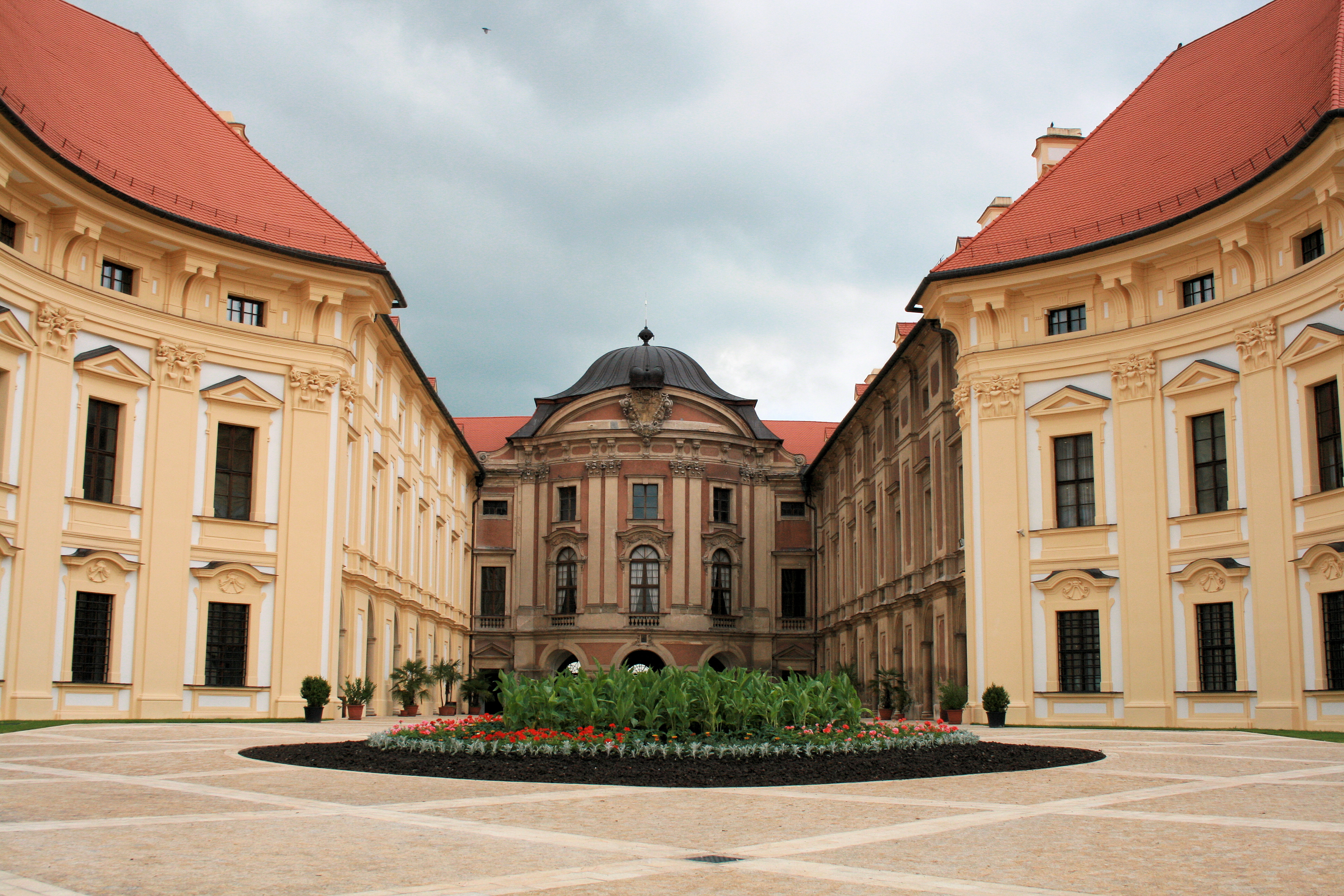
Front view of the Slavkov Castle

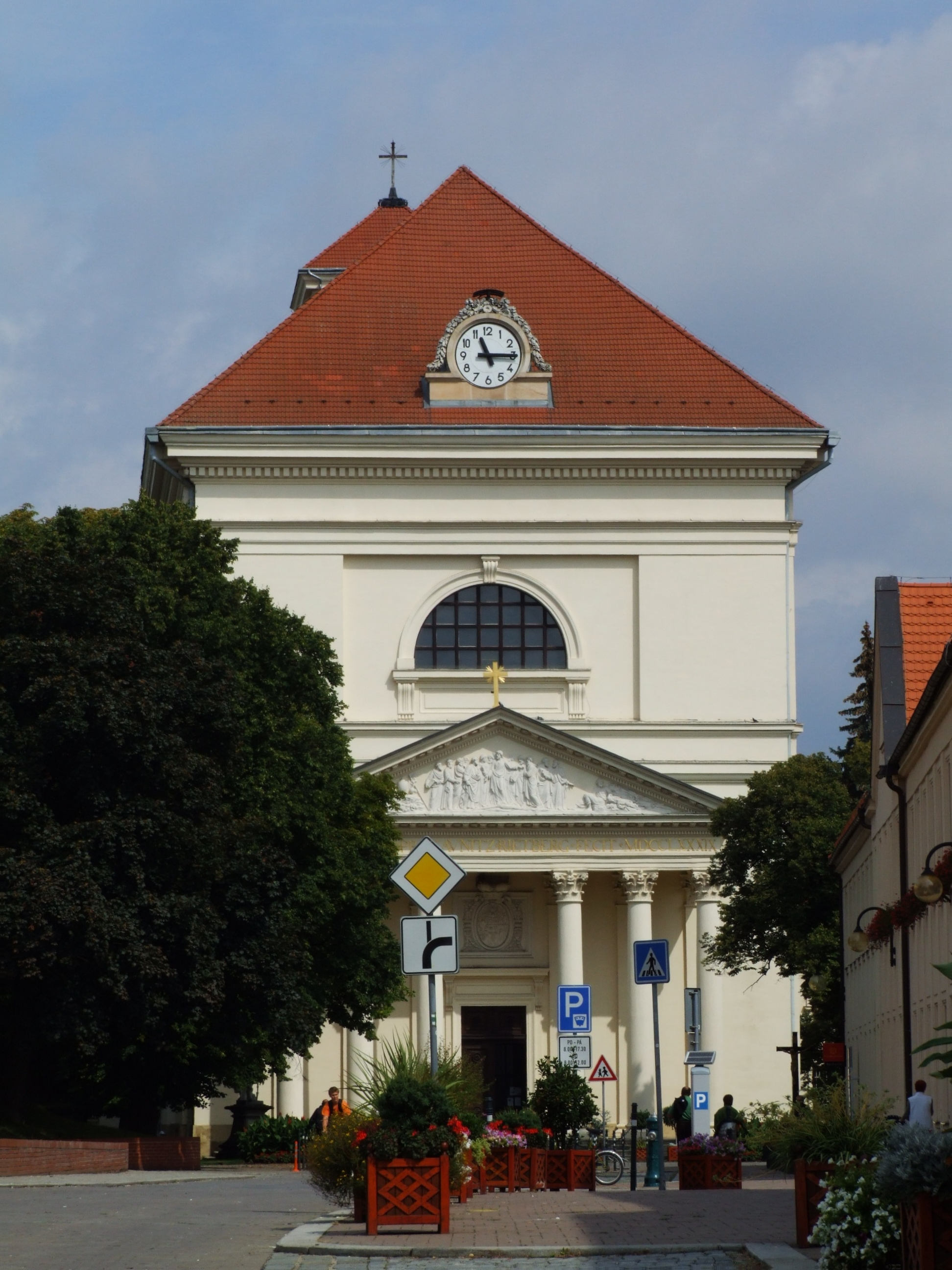
Church of the Resurrection of the Lord

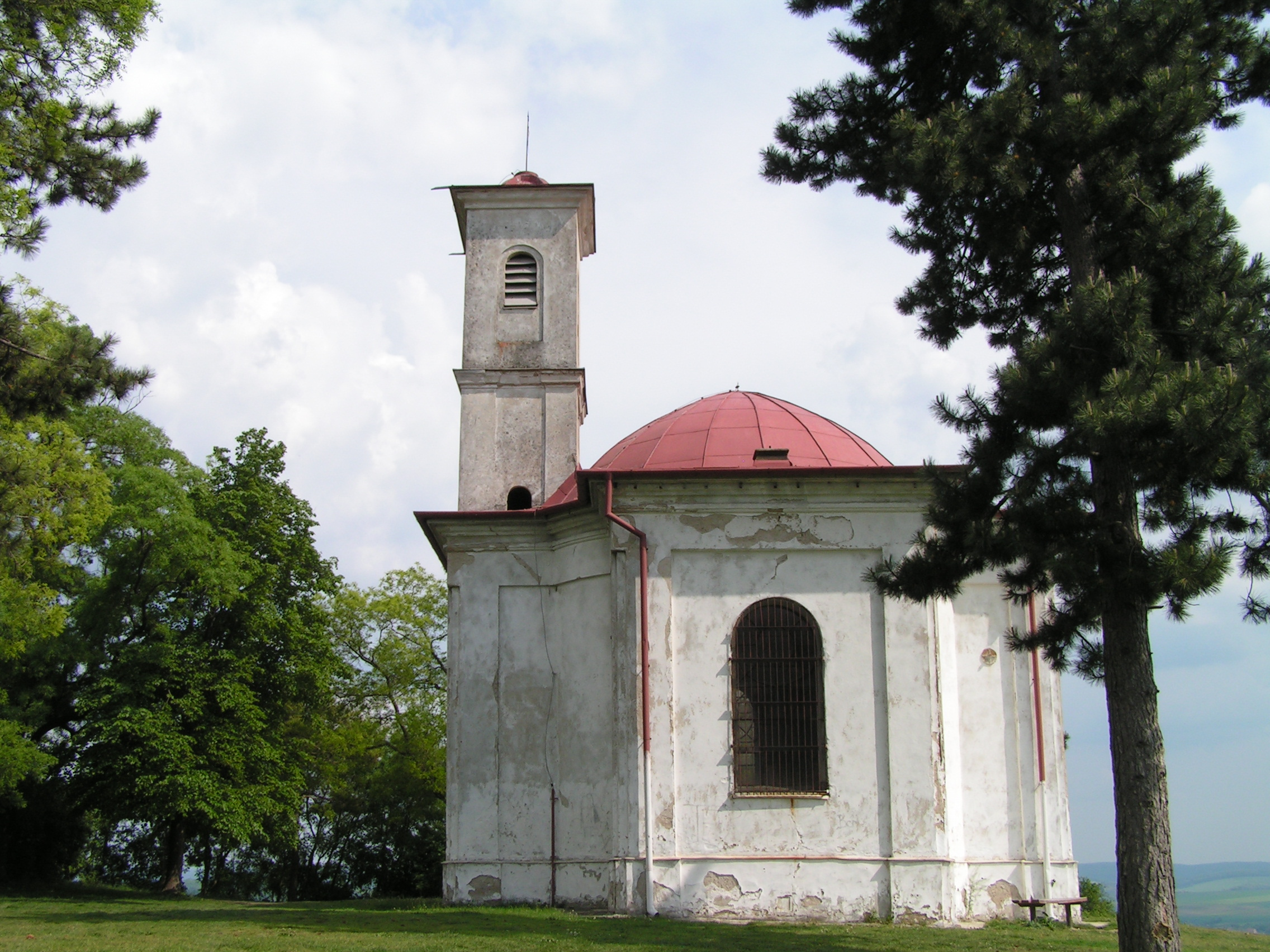
Chapel of Saint Urban

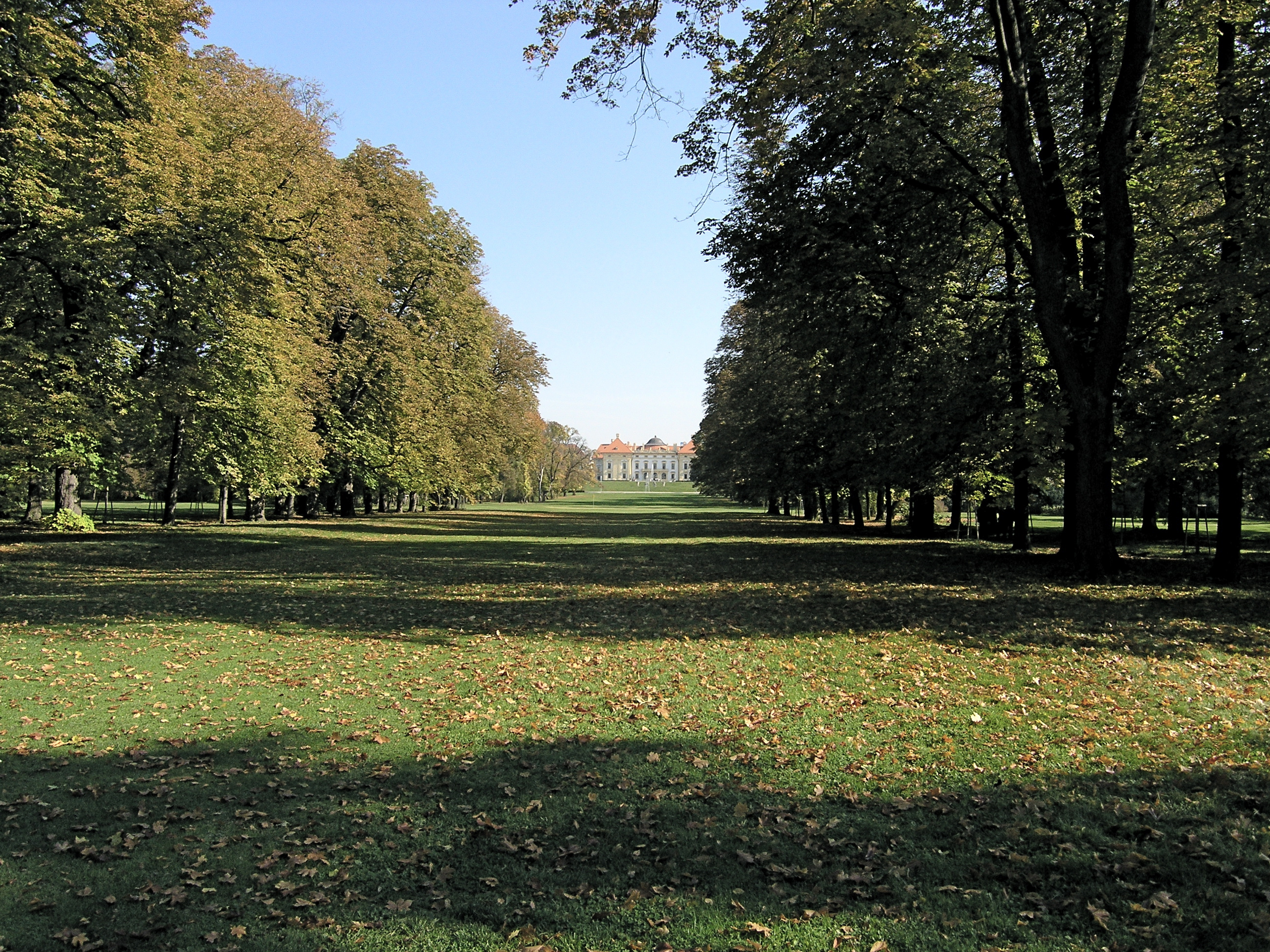
Castle park
