= Hildesheimer =

Hildesheimer is a German and Ashkenazi Jewish toponymic surname meaning "someone from Hildesheim". Notable people with the surname include:

- Azriel Hildesheimer (1820–1899), German rabbi and founder of the Hildesheimer Rabbinical Seminary
- Wolfgang Hildesheimer (1916–1991), German author, great-grandson of Azriel
- Siegmund Hildesheimer (1832–1896), German-born British publisher

== Fictional characters ==
- Matthias Hildesheimer, the main character in the The Strongest Sage with the Weakest Crest Anime series.
