= Peregrin Obdržálek =

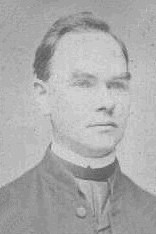
Peregrin Obdržálek, Catholic priest and author of religious literature

Peregrin Obdržálek (pronounced [ˈpɛrɛɡrɪn ˈobdr̩ʒaːlɛk]; 9 May 1825, in Slavkov u Brna, Czech Republic – 29 May 1891, in Břest near Kroměříž, Czech Republic) was a Catholic priest, author of religious literature, satire, and humorous tales and verses.

Peregrin Obdržálek studied in Uherská Skalice, Strážnice, then also philosophy and theology in Brno. After being ordained in 1850, he worked as a curate in Dražovice, Topolany, Brankovice, Pustiměř and in Tichá near Frenštát pod Radhoštěm. After this he became a parson in Blansko; additionally during his work in Břest he was appointed an honour consistory counsellor.

During his vocation he founded libraries in schools, hunted for members for various religious unions, established economic associations, mutual savings banks and heavily contributed to political and humorous-instruction magazines with verses and prose. He especially excelled as a satirist, his treatises Maloměstské dívek vychování (Small-town upbringing of girls), Nedělní zábava maloměšťáků (Sunday pastime of petty bourgeoises), Osudná stovka či námluvy na venkově (Fatal hundred or Courting in the country) and many others appeared in the calendar Moravan (Moravian). Not a few sermons and songs were published in the periodical Posvátná kazatelna (The sacred pulpit). He put out Cvičení maličkých ve svatém náboženství křesťansko-katolickém (Exercise of young ones in the holy Christian Catholicm), a tender book for children, where verses of sacred history and the fundamental doctrine of the Catechism briefly resume. He sometimes used the pseudonym Pelhřim Obdržálek ([ˈpɛlɦr̝ɪm]) in his works.
