= Austerlitz, Kentucky =

Unincorporated community in Kentucky, United States

- Unincorporated community
- Location within Kentucky
- Coordinates: 38°5′26″N 84°13′1″W
- Country: United States
- State: Kentucky
- County: Bourbon
- Named for: Battle of Austerlitz
- Elevation: 928 ft (283 m)
- Time zone: UTC-5 (Eastern (EST))
  - Summer (DST): UTC-4 (EDT)
- GNIS feature ID: 507429

Austerlitz is an unincorporated community in Bourbon County, Kentucky, United States.

It is located along Kentucky Route 57 approximately nine miles south of Paris, Kentucky and 17 miles east of Lexington. It was the location of a former station of the Kentucky Central Railroad (which later became part of the Louisville and Nashville Railroad), along the section of line that runs between Paris and Winchester.

The name of the community likely commemorates the Battle of Austerlitz. The community also had a post office from 1884 to 1954.
