= Austerlitz, Netherlands =

Austerlitz
- Village
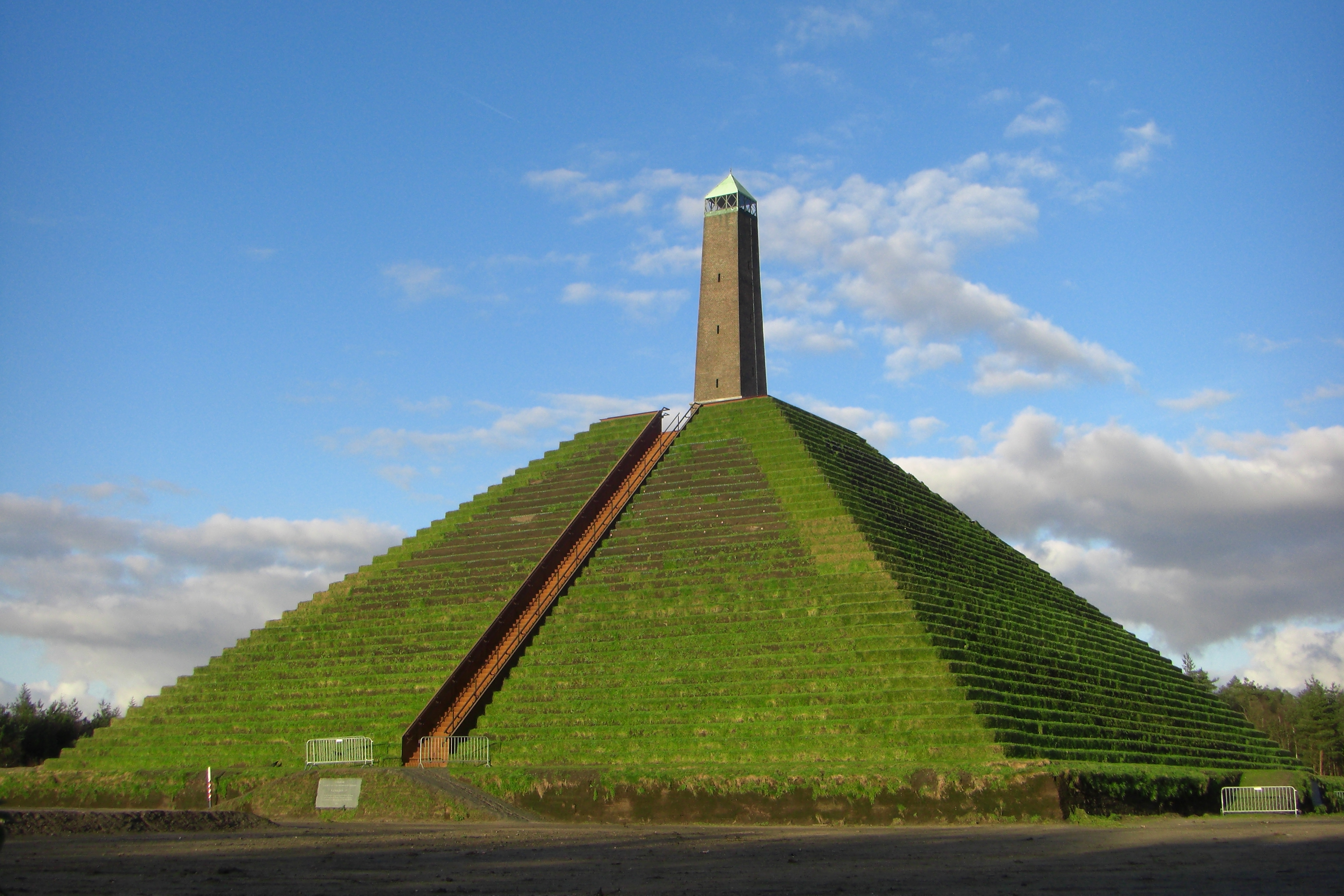
- The Pyramid of Austerlitz

- Flag

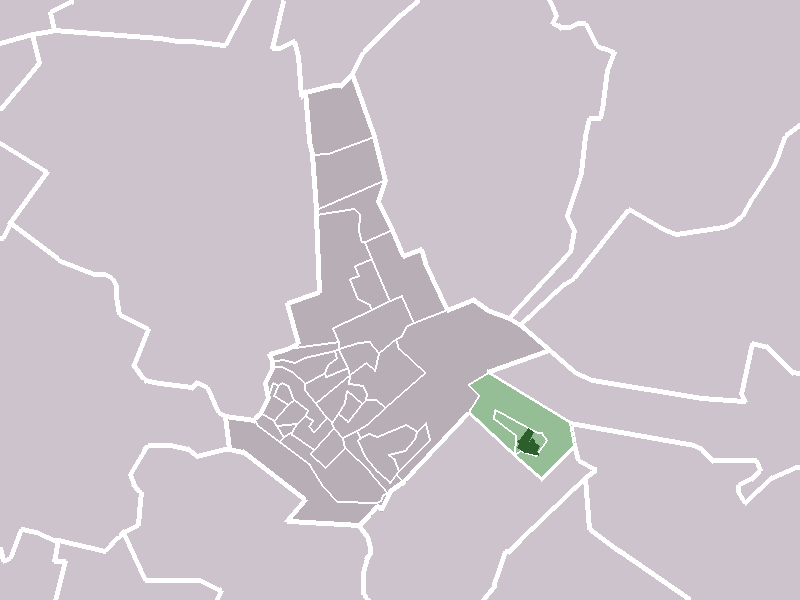

- Location in the Netherlands Austerlitz (Netherlands)
- Coordinates: 52°4′43″N 5°19′0″E
- Country: Netherlands
- Province: Utrecht
- Municipality: Zeist
- Established: 1806

Area
  - Total: 4.34 km^{2} (1.68 sq mi)
- Elevation: 13 m (43 ft)

Population (2021)
  - Total: 1,705
  - Density: 393/km^{2} (1,020/sq mi)
- Time zone: UTC+1 (CET)
  - Summer (DST): UTC+2 (CEST)
- Postal code: 3711
- Dialing code: 0343

Austerlitz (Dutch pronunciation: [ˈʌustərlɪts]) is a village in the Dutch province of Utrecht. It is a part of the municipality of Zeist, and lies about 6 km east of Zeist.

== History ==
In 1804, an army camp was established at the site, called French camp. The town was founded on 17 August 1806 on the location of the camp. It was given its name by King Louis I of Holland in honour of the victory of his brother, Emperor Napoleon in the Battle of Austerlitz. In 1840, it was home to 233 people.

Close to the town, there is an artificial hill called the Pyramid of Austerlitz (52.0904°N 5.3428°E), actually part of the municipality Woudenberg. It used to have a wooden obelisk, but was removed in 1808 due to instability. In 1894, a stone obelisk was added to the top.

== Gallery ==
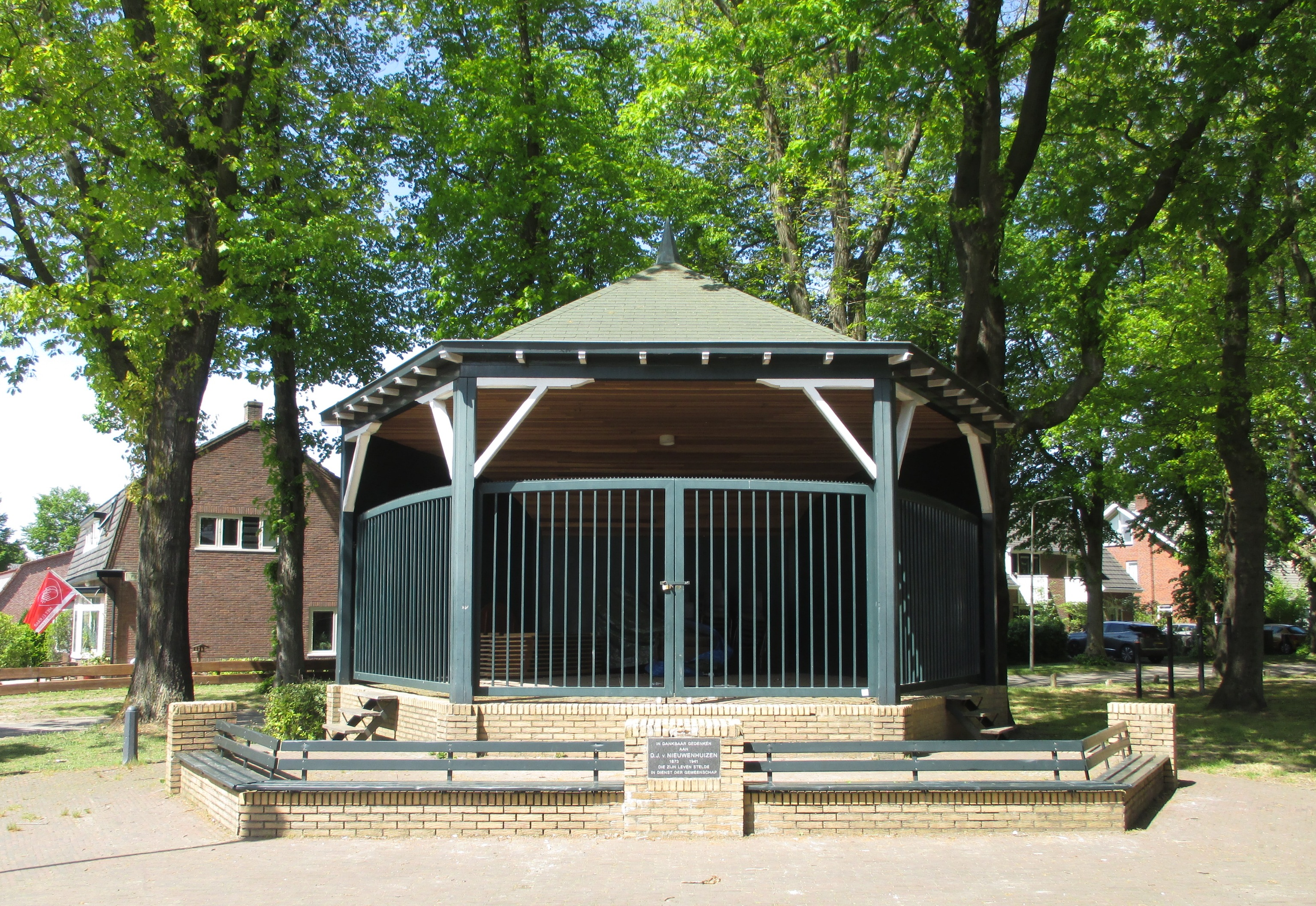
Bandstand in Austerlitz

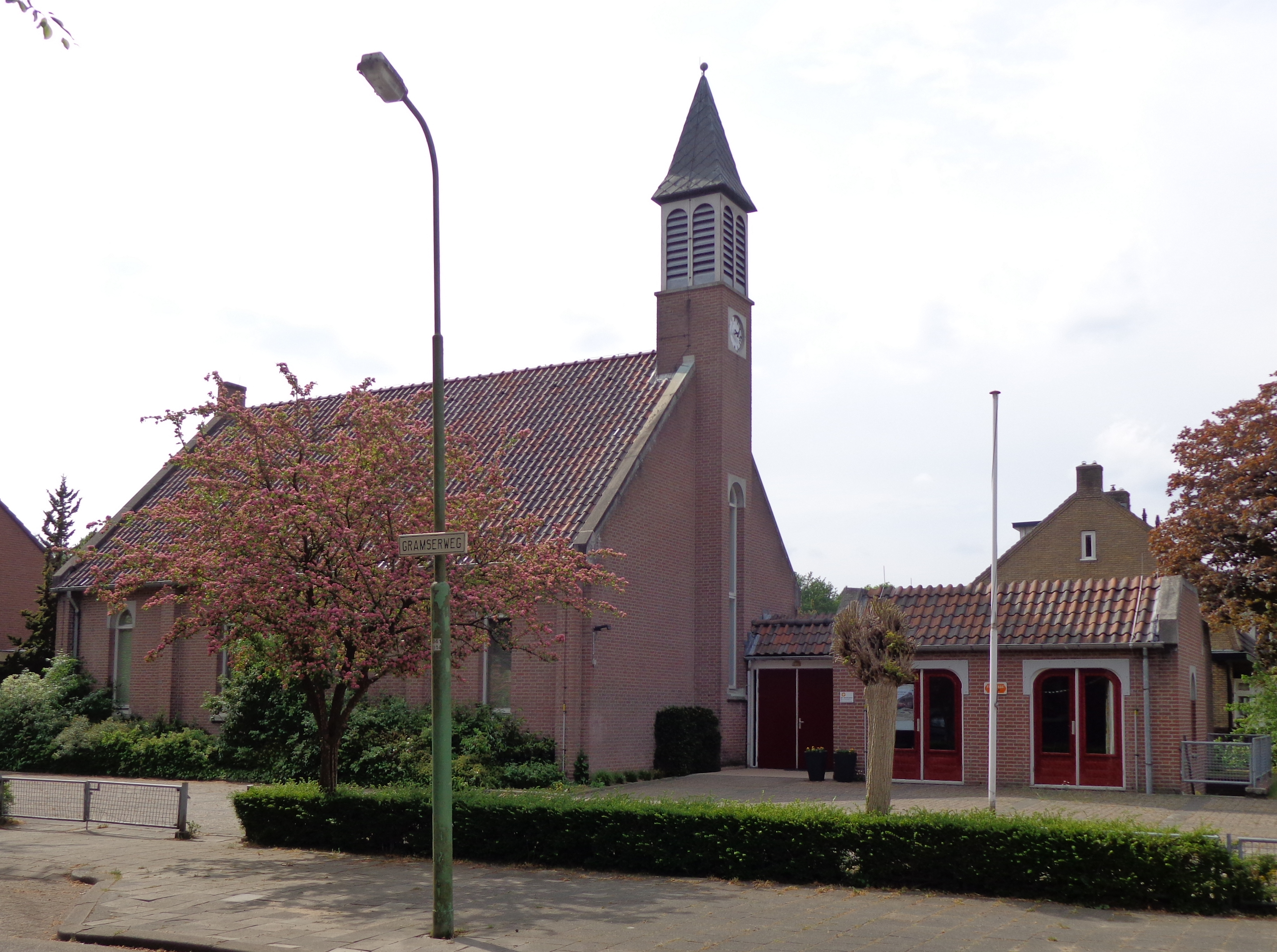
Church in Austerlitz

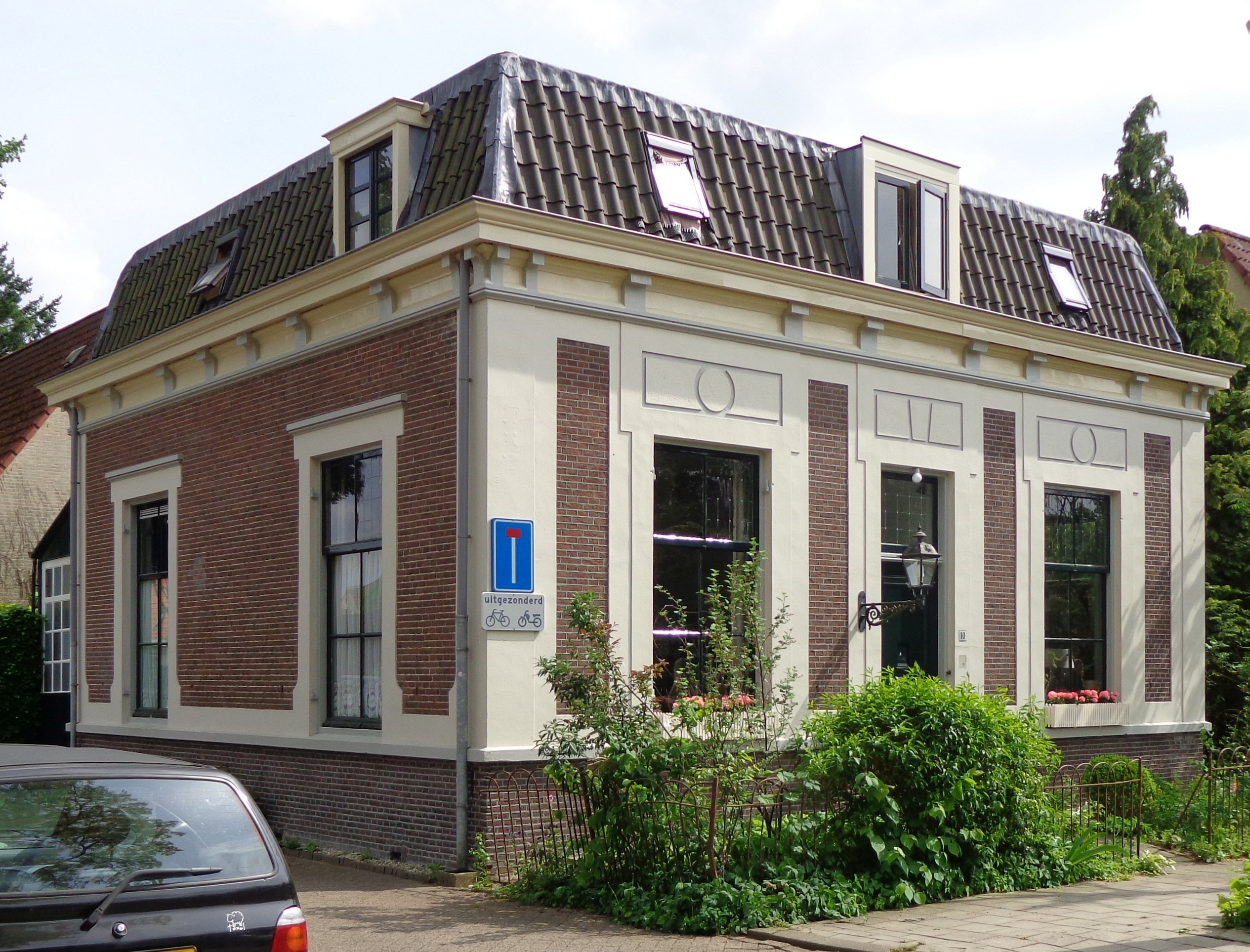
House in Austerlitz

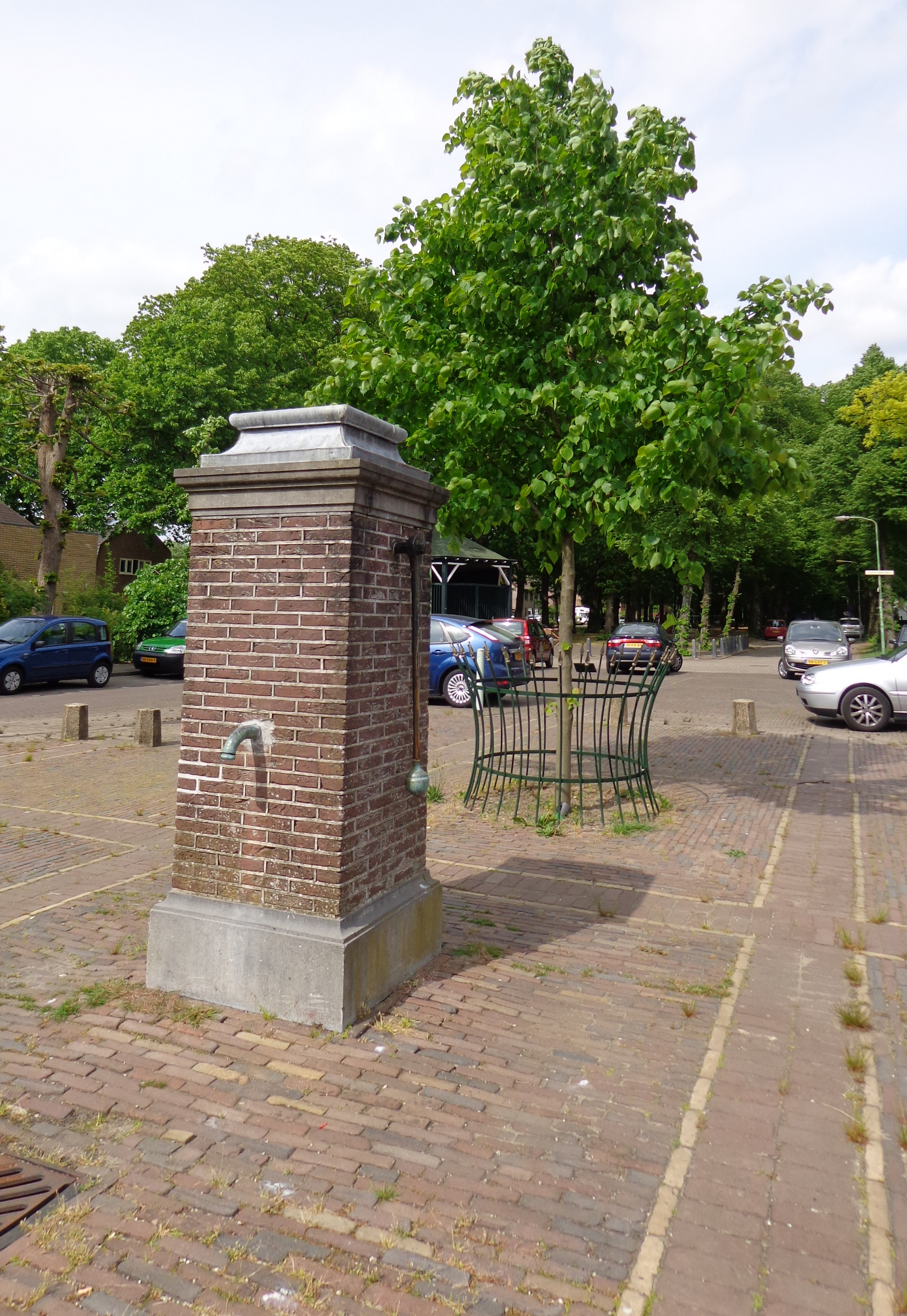
Village pump
