= Zeist =

- Town
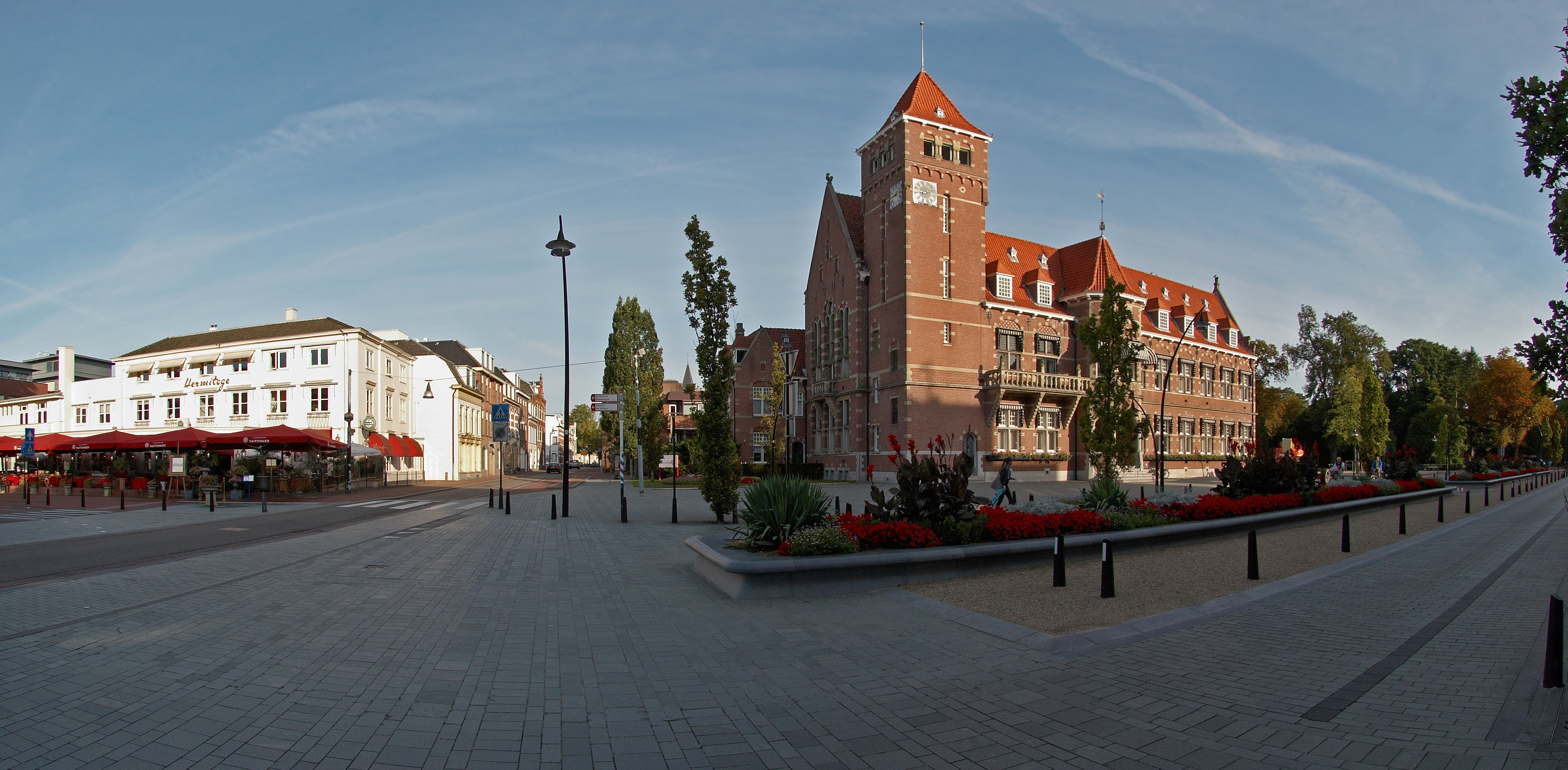
- Zeist city hall

- Flag Coat of arms

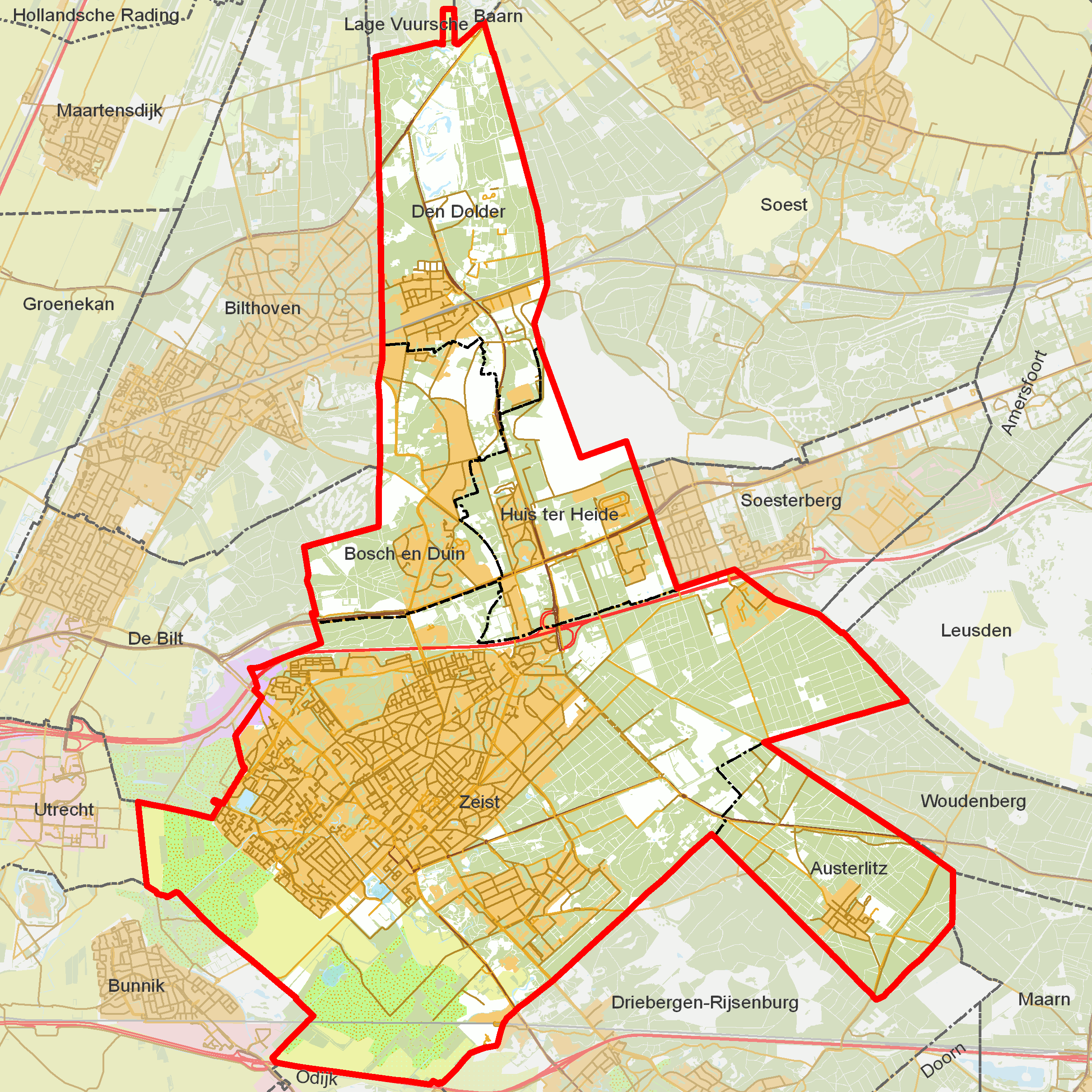
- Districts of Zeist
- Coordinates: 52°5′26″N 5°13′59″E
- Country: Netherlands
- Province: Utrecht
- Municipality: Zeist

Government
  - Body: Municipal council
  - Mayor: Joyce Langenacker (PvdA)
  - Municipal Secretary: R. Grotens
  - Deputy Mayor: L.H.H. Hoogstraten (GL)
  - Council Clerk: J. Janssen

Area
  - Total: 11.77 km^{2} (4.54 sq mi)
- Elevation: 4 m (13 ft)

Population (January 1, 2018)
  - Total: 51,385
  - Density: 4,366/km^{2} (11,310/sq mi)
- Demonym: Zeistenaar
- Time zone: UTC+1 (CET)
  - Summer (DST): UTC+2 (CEST)
- Postcode: 3700–3709
- Area code: 030
- Website: www.zeist.nl

Zeist (Dutch pronunciation: [ˈzɛist]) is the largest town of the municipality of Zeist. The town is located in the Utrecht province of the Netherlands, east of the city of Utrecht.

== History ==
The town of "Seist" was first mentioned in a charter in the year 838. The original settlement was located at the present Dorpsstraat. In the late 12th century, a church was built here. Its tower is now a part of the Reformed Church, the remainder of which was built in the 19th century. Until medieval times, a branch of the river Rhine flowed close to the centre of the town. Three mansions were built near the village: the Huis te Zeist, Kersbergen, and Blikkenburg.

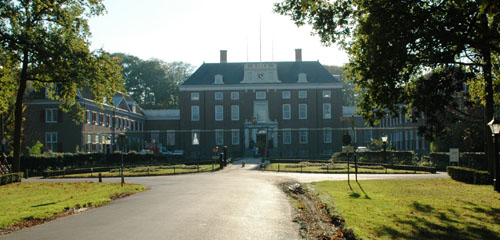
Slot Zeist

From 1677 to 1686, the "Slot Zeist" was built on or near the ruins of "Kasteel Zeist", the original castle (donjon) of Rodgar van Zeist. There is very little documentation on the family that lived there, but a few names are found: in the 12th century a Godefridus de Seist and in the late 13th century another Godefridus, a knight, with his son Johannes and his daughter Petronilla. (Bronnen voor de geschiedenis van Zeist, deel 1, ed. Van Hinsbergen) The last member of the van Zeist family was a woman, Elisabeth van Zeist, who married a member of the Borre van Amerongen family. They had a son who adopted his mother's name and his father's coat-of-arms.

In the last quarter of the 17th century, Count Willem Adriaan van Nassau, an illegitimate descendant of Prince Maurice of Orange, acquired the property and built Slot Zeist in the Dutch Classicist style. Murals by Daniel Marot are still largely intact. Members of the Evangelische Broedergemeente (Evangelical Brethren's Congregation), the Dutch name for the Moravians, settled in Zeist in 1746, building for their community an impressive array of 18th century Classicist houses planned around two squares. Their headquarters are still located in the centre of town, next to "the palace". The oldest Dutch archives of the Moravians are kept at the Utrecht Archival Centre at Utrecht.

In the 19th century, Zeist became a favorite residence for the rich, mainly from the city of Utrecht.

Camp New Amsterdam, (vliegbasis Soesterberg) a former Royal Netherlands Air Force military airbase near this town, was the venue for the Pan Am Flight 103 bombing trial to take place outside the UK, but under Scots law. The court was designated the Scottish Court in the Netherlands.

== Organisations and surroundings ==
Zeist is the location of the Royal Dutch Football Association (KNVB), the Royal Dutch Korfball Association (KNKV) and the International Korfball Federation(IKF). It is also known for the forests surrounding the town. For many years the Dutch National Archaeological Research Service (Rijksdienst voor het Oudheidkundig Bodemonderzoek) was housed at Slot Zeist. Triodos Bank headquarters was also based there.

== Notable people ==
The following notable persons were born in Zeist:

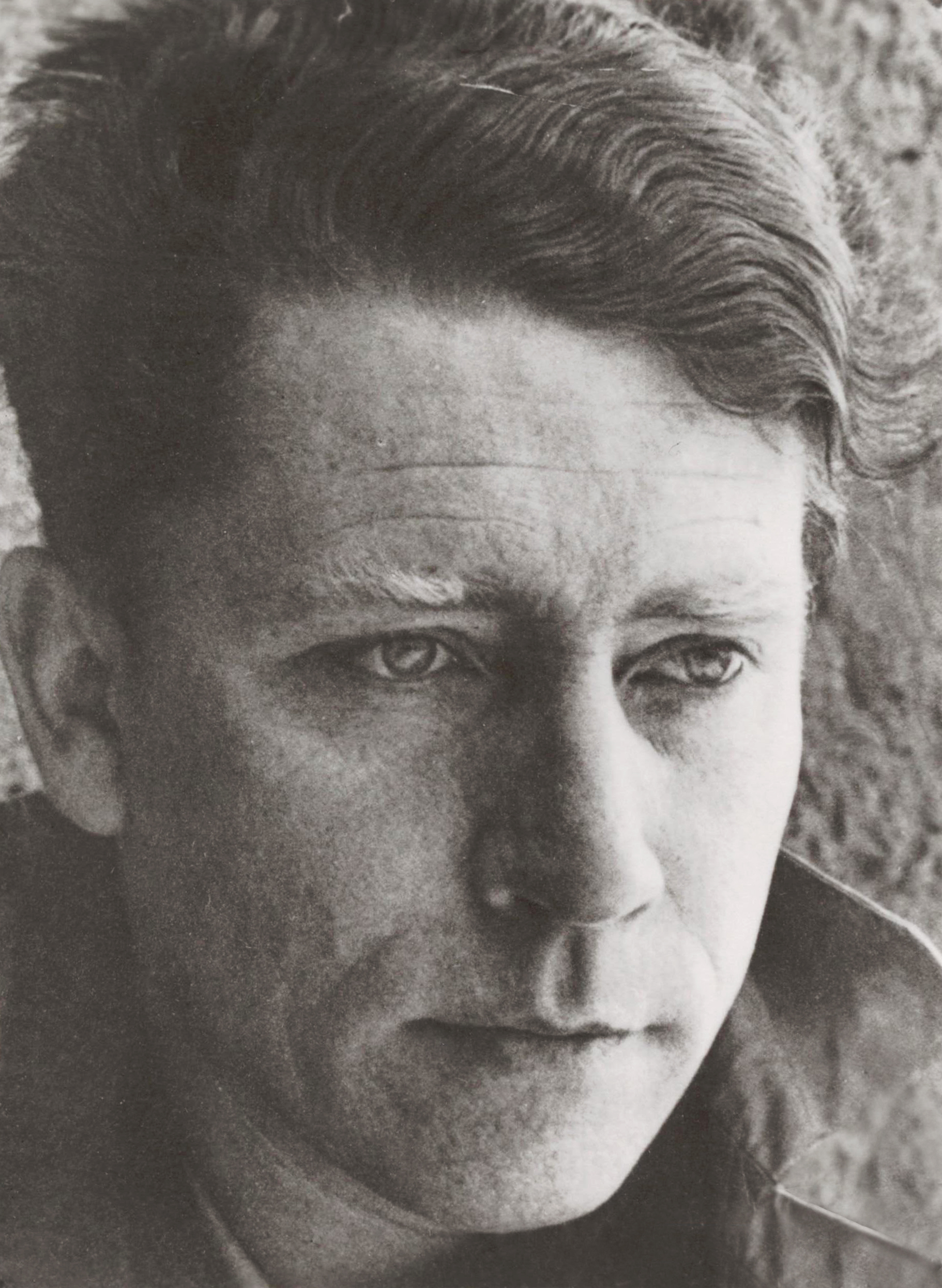
Hendrik Marsman 1930s

- Guido Verbeck (1830–1898) political adviser, educator and missionary, worked as a foreign adviser in Japan
- Hermann Snellen (1834–1908) ophthalmologist, invented the Snellen chart
- Anthon van Rappard (1858–1892) painter and draughtsman
- Willem Pijper, (1894–1947) composer, music critic and music teacher
- Hendrik Marsman, (1899–1940) poet and writer
- Isaäc Arend Diepenhorst, (1916–2004) former minister of education
- Johan Witteveen (1921–2019) politician and MD of the International Monetary Fund (IMF) 1973-1978
- Carel Blotkamp (born 1945) artist, art historian, writer and critic
- Wam Kat, (born 1956) political activist and author
- Mark Overmars, (born 1958) author of GameMaker Studio
- Jan van de Pavert (born 1960) sculptor, painter, draftsman, animator, and video artist
- Mirjam Sterk (born 1973) former politician, civil servant and educator

=== Sport ===
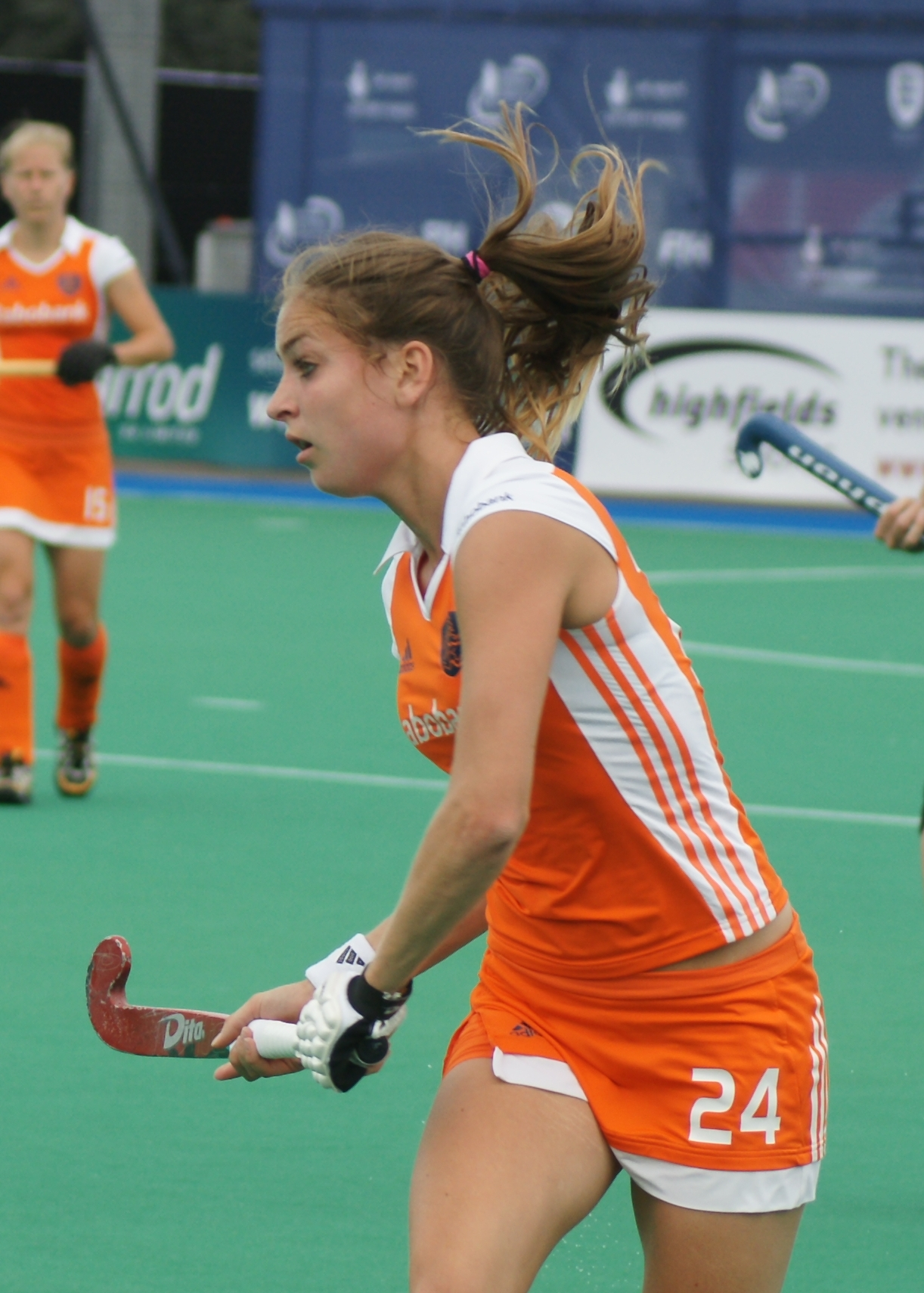
Eva de Goede, 2009

- Henk Kamerbeek (1893–1954) hammer thrower, competed at the 1924 and 1928 Summer Olympics
- André Bolhuis (born 1946) a retired field hockey player, competed at the 1972 and 1976 Summer Olympics
- Bert Blyleven, (born 1951) Major League Baseball Hall of Fame pitcher
- Guusje van Mourik (born 1955) karateka, judoka and boxer
- Jos Ruijs (born 1955) rower, competed in the 1976 Summer Olympics
- Chima Onyeike (born 1975) football coach and former professional player with 257 caps
- Jeroen Rauwerdink (born 1985) volleyball player
- Eva de Goede (born 1989) field hockey player, gold medalist in the 2008, 2012 and 2020 Summer Olympics, and silver medallist at the 2016 Summer Olympics
- Jurgen Ekkelenkamp (born 2000) football player

== Transport ==
Zeist has two railway stations. Driebergen-Zeist railway station is located between Zeist and Driebergen-Rijsenburg, to the south of Zeist. It is on the Amsterdam–Arnhem railway. Den Dolder railway station is located in Den Dolder. It is on the Utrecht–Kampen railway and the Den Dolder–Baarn railway. Zeist also has two major bus hubs, one on the Jordanlaan and one at Handelscentrum. They have 6 and 4 lines going through respectively.

== Gallery ==
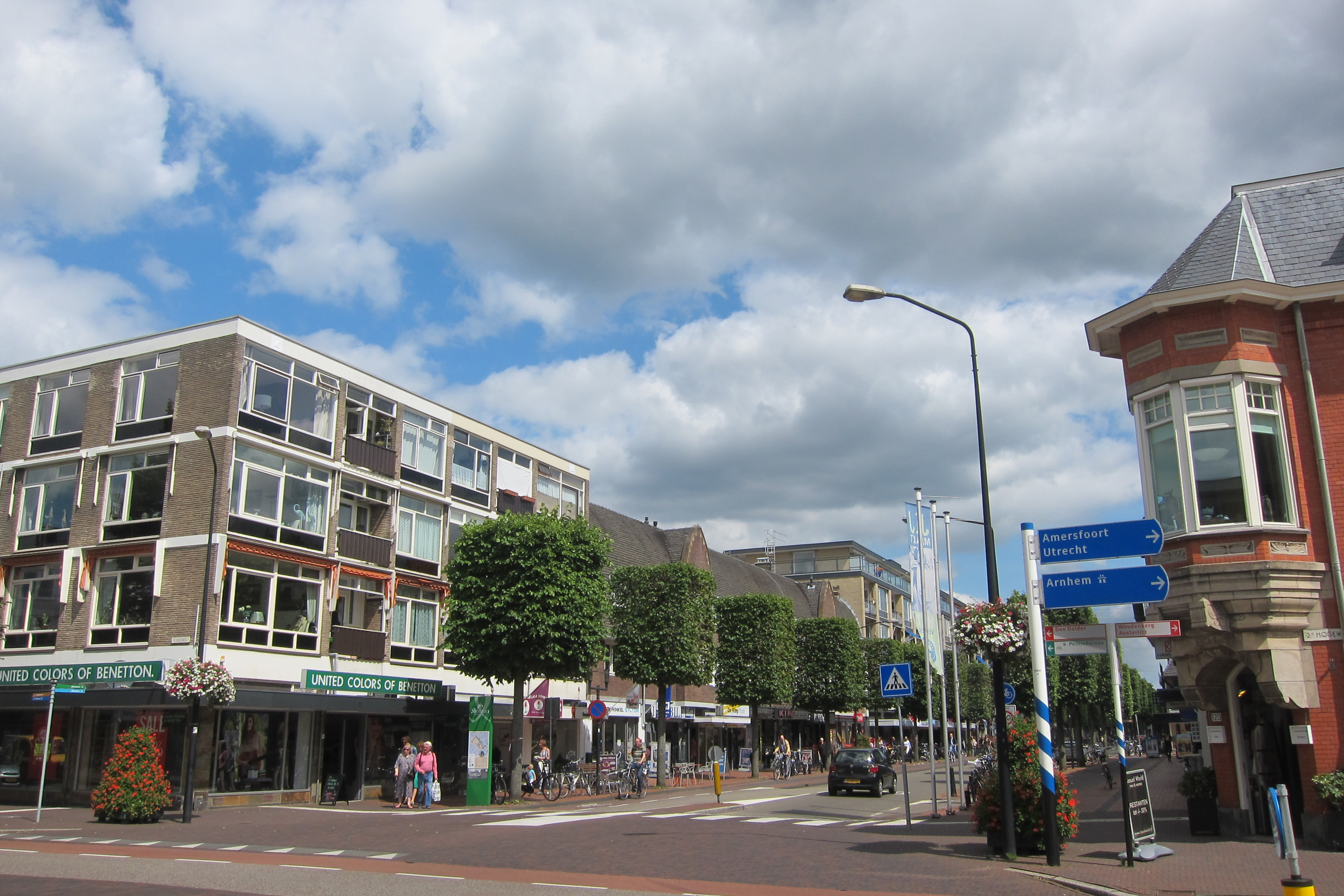
Main shopping street, Zeist

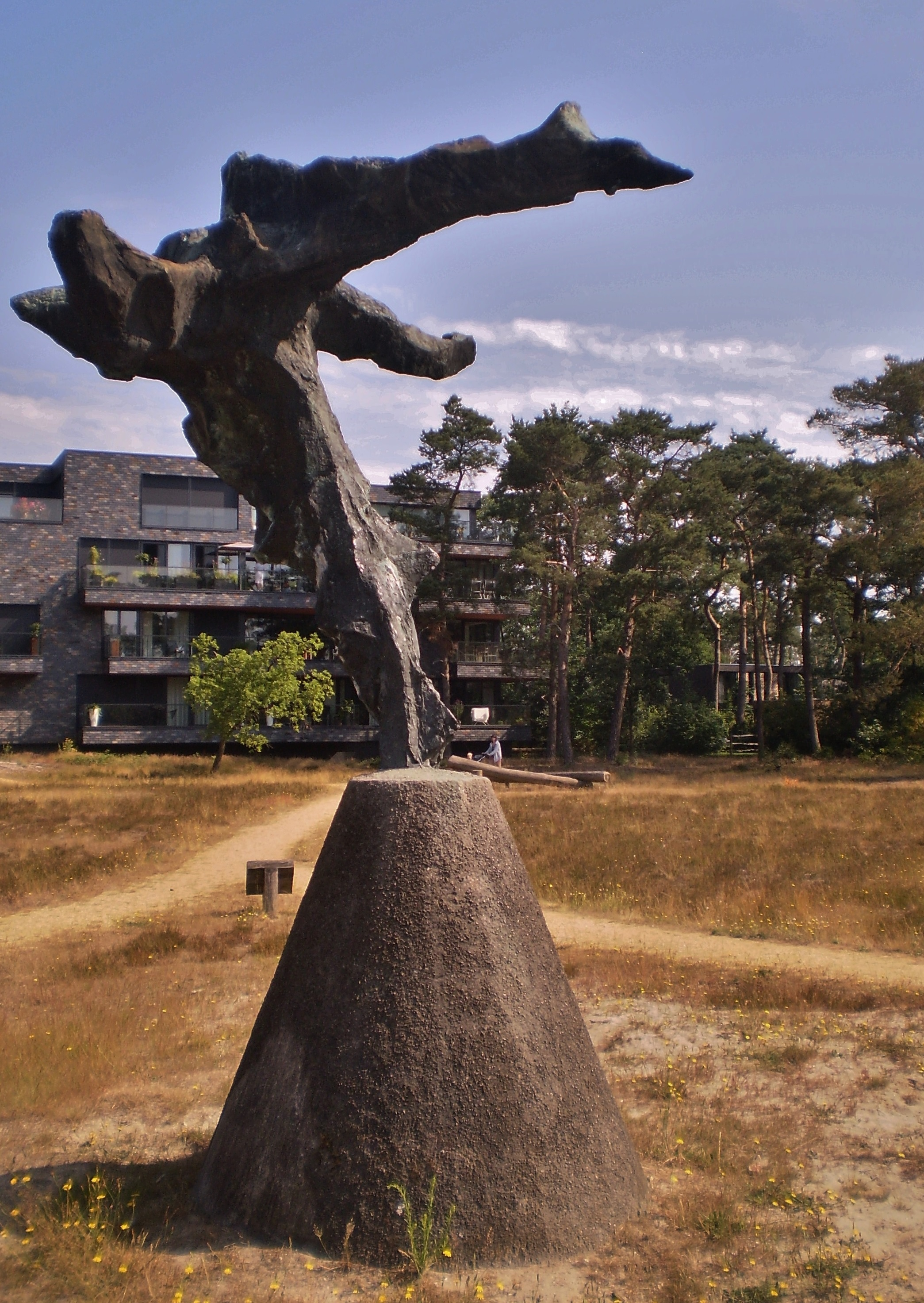
Jan de Baat De Zee Zeist

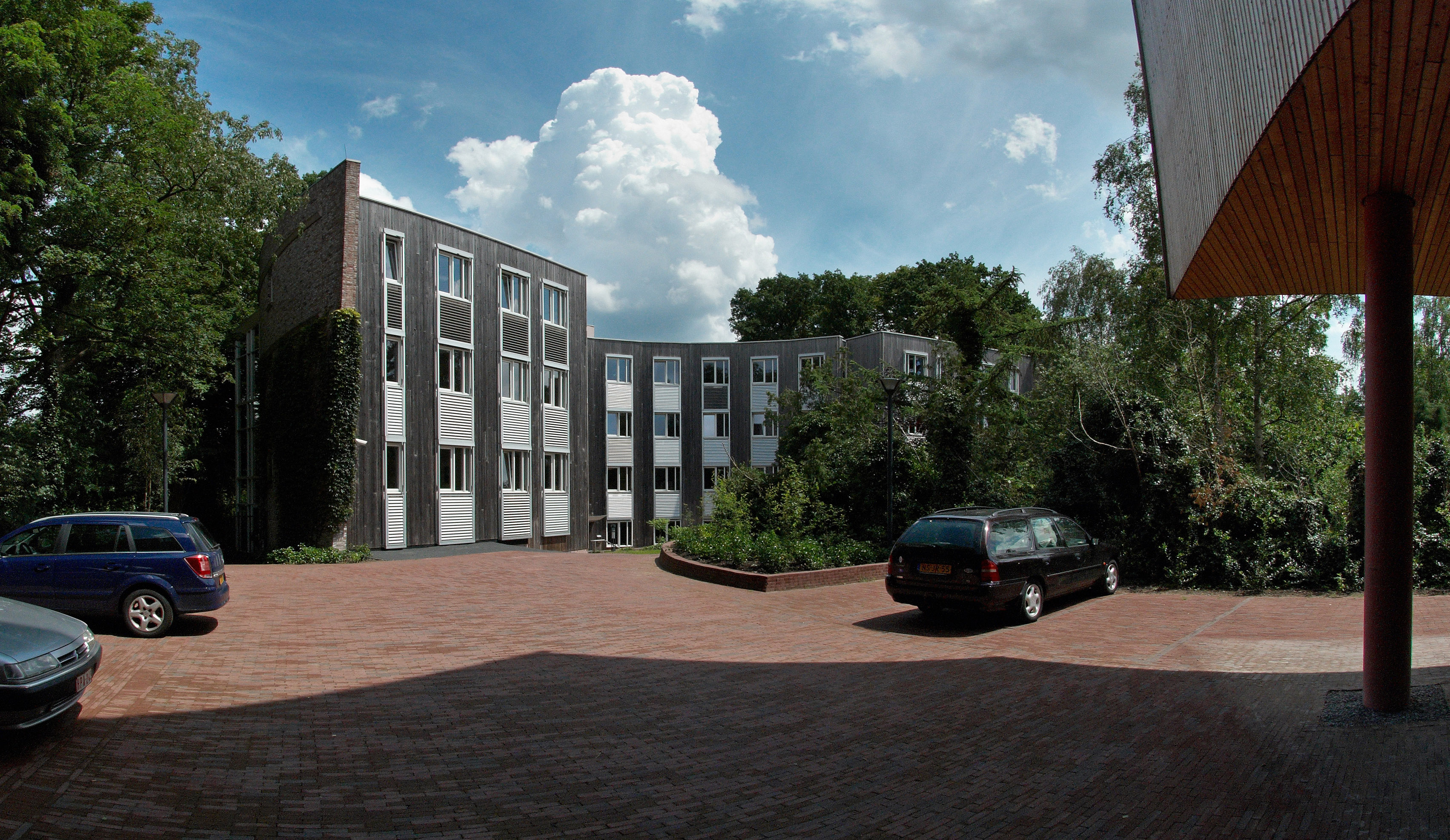
Triodos Bank, Zeist

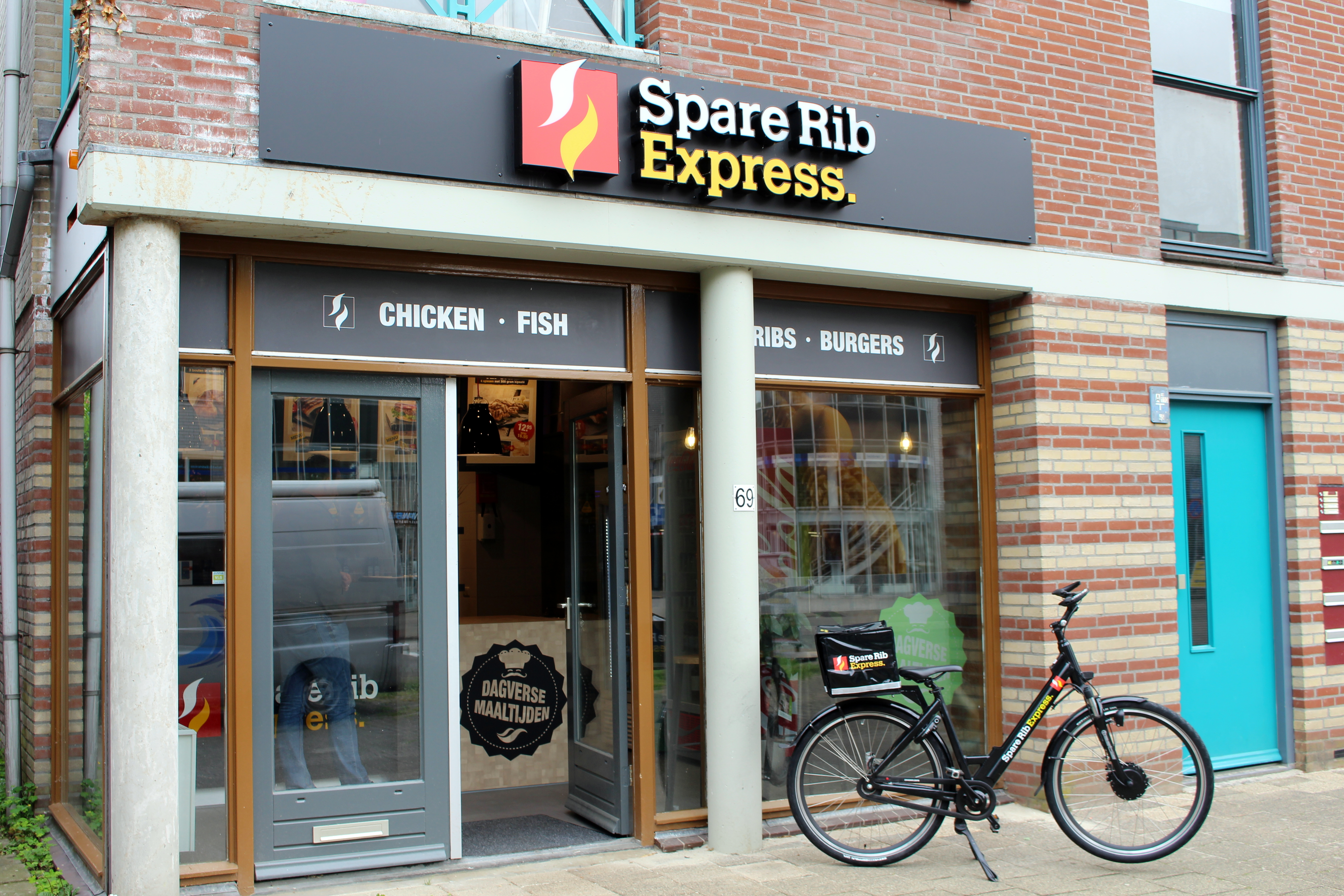
Shops in Zeist

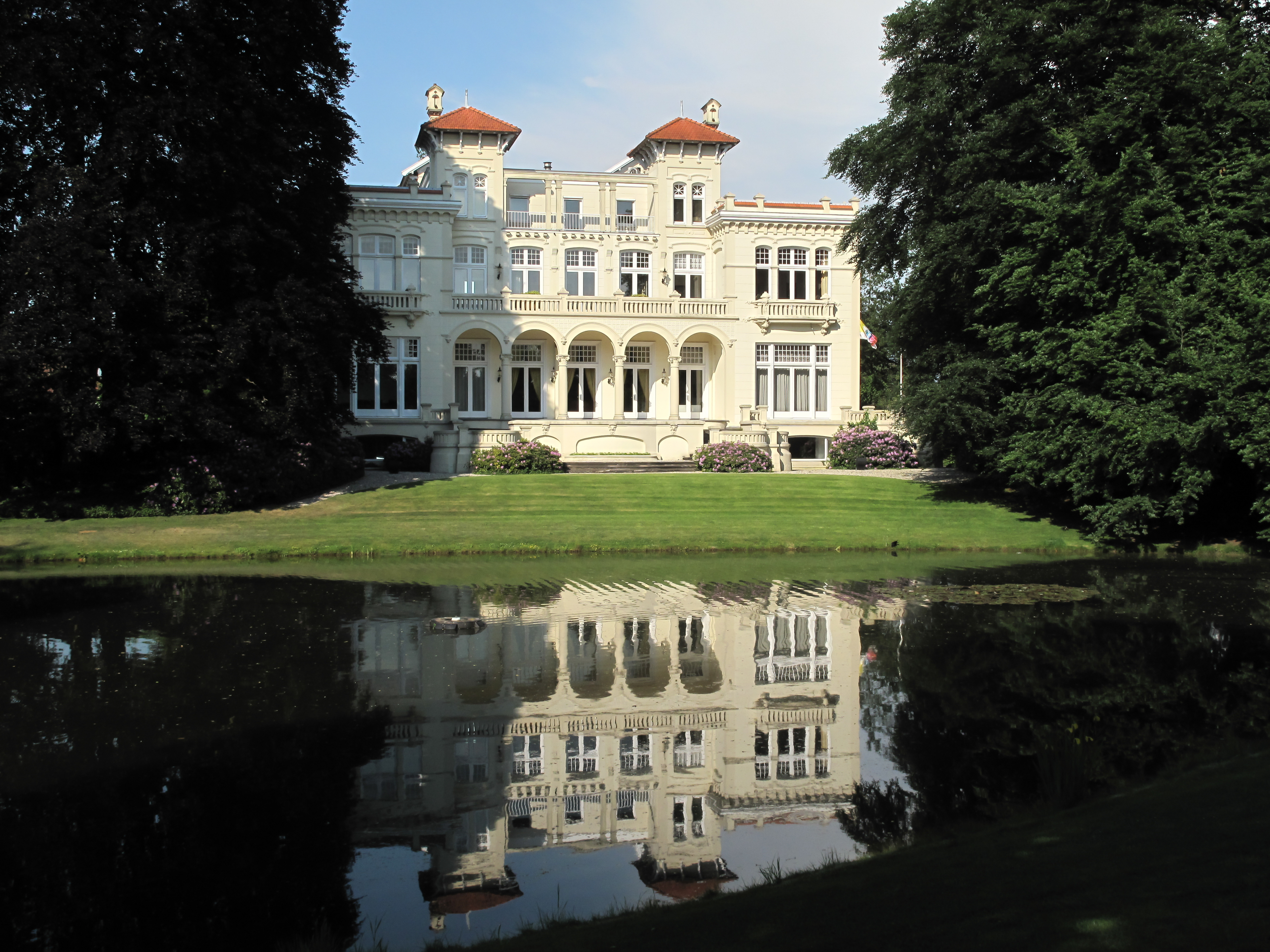
Villa Ma Retraite

== See also ==
- Zeist (municipality)
- Utrecht
- Utrecht (province)
- Utrecht (municipality)
