= Sker House (novel) =

Sker House is a thriller novel, written by Carnegie Medal winning author Ronald Welch, and published in 1955. It is the only one of his books published under his real name – Ronald Felton. It is chiefly set in London, but the showdown takes place in South Wales.

== Plot ==
The story begins with Anthony Fitzgerald's waking up to discover he is chained to a sink in a factory bathroom somewhere in London, with no memory of how he ended up here. The other prisoner is David Blackwell, who is equally confused. Both men are criminals – Anthony represents a Welsh burglary gang and David a London gang of fences – and had arranged to meet in order to exchange an extremely valuable diamond necklace stolen in Cardiff for money. Both the money and the necklace are now missing, and both men, after initially accusing the other of robbing them, realise that they must work together in order to discover who set them both up. Both men call their respective bosses (Anthony's is his own brother Alun), and are told that if they do not recover the money/necklace, they will not have a pleasant ending.

With this, the duo begin retracing their steps from the previous day. The last thing that both men remember was meeting in a pub for the exchange. Going to the pub, they intimidate a frightened bar girl into admitting that she was paid to spike their drinks, under the mistaken belief that this was a practical joke being played upon the duo by their friends. The description she gives them of the man who paid her to do this is of a one-eyed man in a Provincial Railways uniform with a strong Welsh accent.

The men go to Paddington Station, but have no luck with their enquiries. However, one train guard meeting this description flees as he sees both men, boarding a sleeper train and leaving the platform for Penzance. Fitzgerald and Blackwell jump on the train as well, and pursue the man through the train. A fight takes place at the end of the train, and the guard is shot by Blackwell, collapsing against the door and half falling out of the train. They force the guard at gunpoint, as he clings to the door, to tell them where he took the jewels, and he subsequently does (while sneering at Fitzgerald's foolishness), giving them a phone number to call for his contact in Bridgend, near where Anthony's boss lives. Once he has given this information up, Blackwell kicks him fully out of the speeding train.

The two men subsequently travel to Bridgend, and phone the number from a local phonebox, and, impersonating the guard, tell the man on the other end of the line that there is a problem. The voice tells them to come to the gang's headquarters near Sker House. When the duo arrive, the house seems empty, and the rest of the gang is absent. They do however encounter Alun in his office, who holds them at gunpoint. He opens his safe to show them both the necklace and the money. He explains that Anthony was becoming too powerful in the gang and was commanding too much respect, and this was his intended way of disposing of him. As he prepares to shoot them, Anthony charges him down, knocking the gun out of his hand, but being shot in the shoulder in doing this. David then uses his own gun to execute Alun. Anthony explains that his wound is not too serious, and David agrees, saying "that's the problem" and then shoots Anthony dead. He retrieves both the necklace and the money, and leaves the house whistling.

The schoolboys Peter and Gwyn, the protagonists of Welch's award-winning novel The Gauntlet, make a cameo appearance in this book explaining to an irate ticket collector that they have lost their tickets.

== Publication history ==
The book was only published once, as a hardback, by Hutchinson Press in 1954.
