= Maud de Braose (disambiguation) =

Maud de Braose may refer to:

- Maud de Braose or Maud de St Valéry (c.1155–1210), wife of William de Braose, 4th Lord of Bramber
- Maud de Braose, Baroness Mortimer (1224–1301), wife of Roger Mortimer, 1st Baron Mortimer
- Maud de Braose (d. 1210), wife of Gruffydd ap Rhys II
- Maud de Braose, daughter of William de Braose, 3rd Lord of Bramber
- Matilda de Braose (Deheubarth) wife of Rhys Mechyll
