= Sker House =

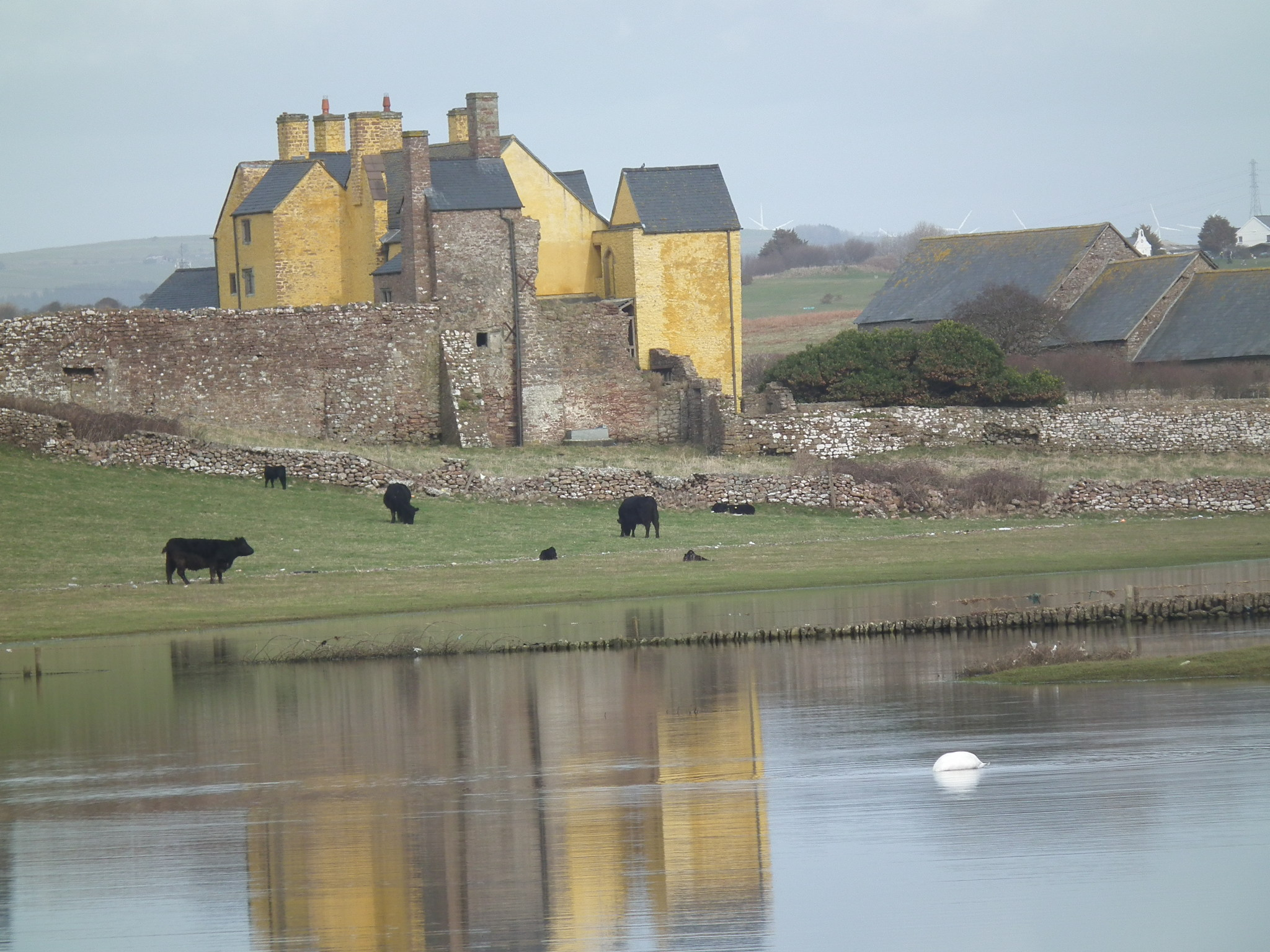
- "one of the major Elizabethan houses of South Wales"

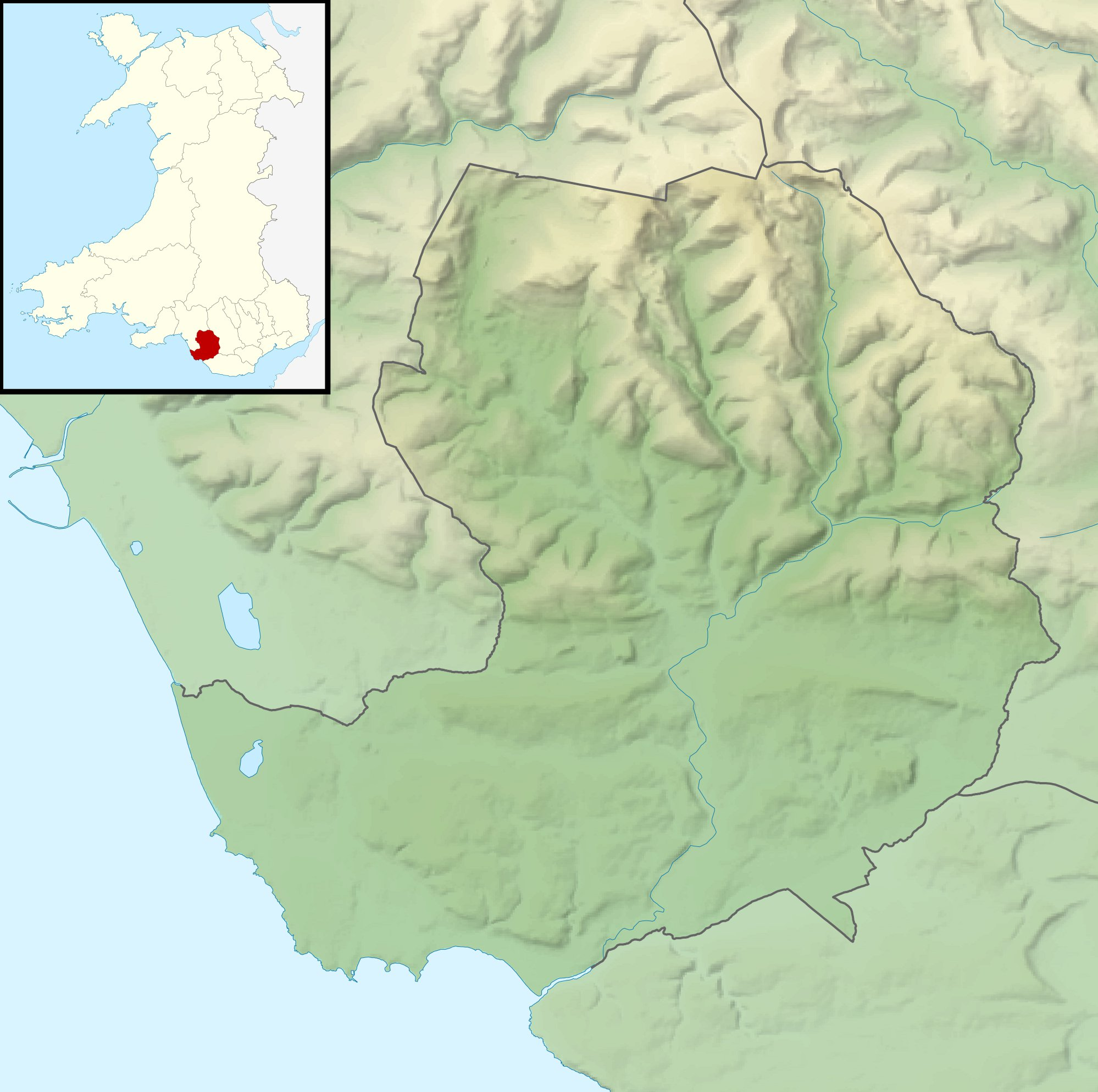
- Location within Bridgend
- 51.5074°N 3.7177°W
- Type: House
- Location: Porthcawl, Bridgend, Wales

History
- Built: 1692

Site notes
- Architectural style: Vernacular
- Governing body: Privately owned

Listed Building – Grade I
- Official name: Sker House
- Designated: 6 June 1952
- Reference no.: 11217

Listed Building – Grade II
- Official name: Ty-yr-ychen, also known as Sker House farm buildings
- Designated: 1 June 1989
- Reference no.: 11360

Sker House is a historic building in Wales. Originally built as a monastic grange of the Cistercian order over 900 years ago, it is situated just outside the town of Porthcawl, near Bridgend. Little remains of the original structure and it was completely rebuilt in the late sixteenth century. Its residential form appears to have been determined by the preceding monastic grange.

The house is largely famous as the basis of R. D. Blackmore's book The Maid of Sker, the 1955 novel Sker House by Ronald Welch, as well as the 2020 video game Maid of Sker and its sequel Sker Ritual.

== History ==
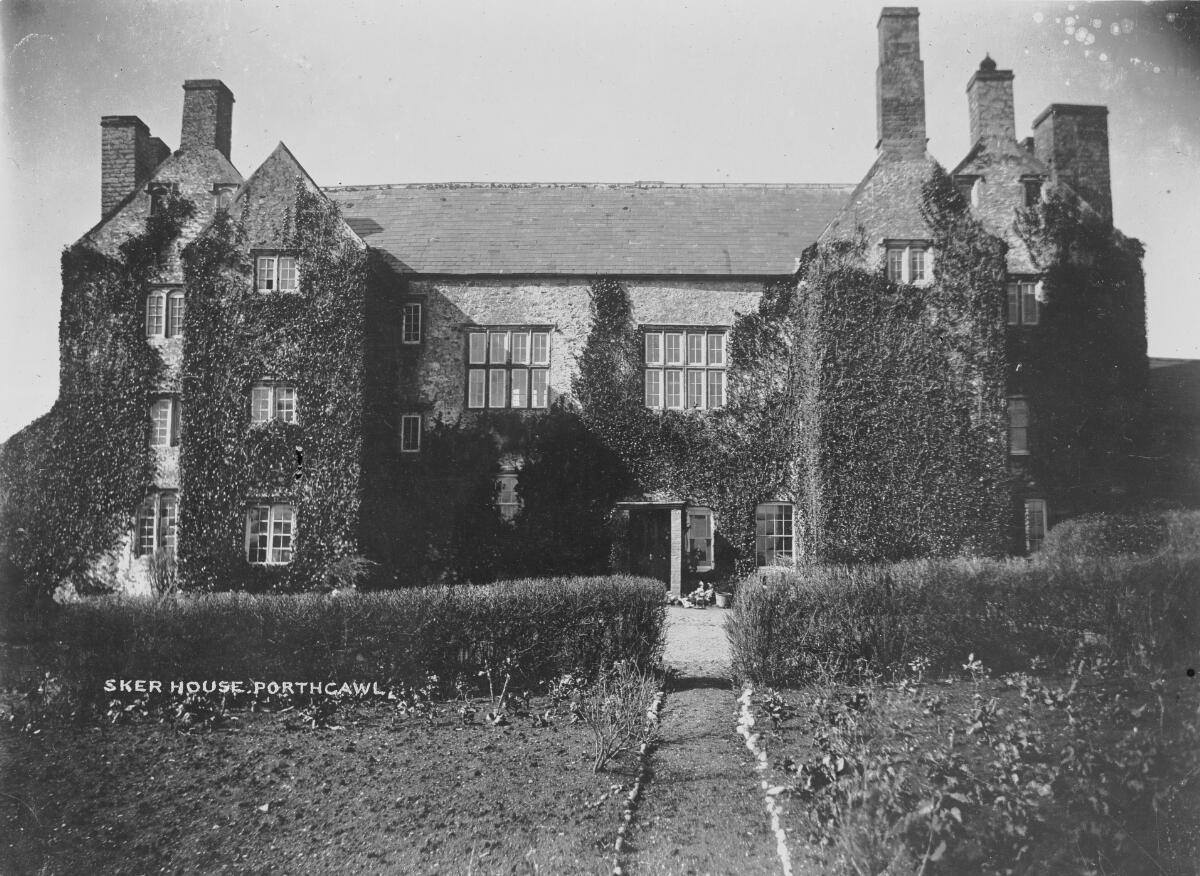
Sker House circa 1905

Sker House was constructed about 900 years ago as the grange of Neath Abbey. There would have been a farm with outbuildings and barns, accommodation for the Cistercian monks who worked there and a chapel. Not much of the medieval house remains but one of the buildings may be preserved as part of the nearby large barn, Tŷ yr Ychen, which is also medieval. In 1543, after the dissolution of the monasteries, the property was purchased by Richard Williams, and soon afterwards repurchased by Christopher Turberville.

The original house had a single storey but in the late sixteenth century, under the ownership of Jenkin Turberville, substantial rebuilding took place, probably retaining the layout of the original building. The house now became a gaunt grey three-storey building with attics. The east wing had two large, symmetrically arranged turrets, where the main doors were and through which all the storeys could be accessed. The west wing had several more randomly-placed turrets and towers, one of which housed a staircase to all floors.

The great hall occupied the central part of the house on the first floor, and extended upwards into the second floor. There was a parlour on one side of this and living accommodation on the other, while the ground floor housed the kitchens, offices and servants quarters.

== Modern times ==
After the Turbervilles left the property, it was held by absentee landlords and let to a series of tenants and its condition declined. It belonged to the Margam Estate until 1941. After many years of abandonment, the south wing eventually collapsed. Beginning on 31 March 1999, the building underwent a significant restoration. The project ended in July 2003. The house's troubled history continued when the contractors for the restoration ran into massive overspending and went into receivership at the end of 1999. In 2003, the house was sold to Niall Ferguson. It now stands whitewashed in yellow against the backdrop of the barren sands of Kenfig Burrows and the sea. It is a Grade I listed building, and Cadw describes it as "one of the major Elizabethan houses of South Wales".

== In fiction ==
Sker House was made famous through a novel written by R.D. Blackmore, The Maid of Sker, published in 1872. It is also reputed to be haunted. Another novel, Sker House by Ronald Welch, was published in 1955.
