= Carreg Cennen Castle =

Castle in Carmarthenshire, Wales

- Castell Carreg Cennen (Welsh) (Note: Since 2024, Cadw, who maintain the site, use the Welsh name only.)
- Carmarthenshire, Wales
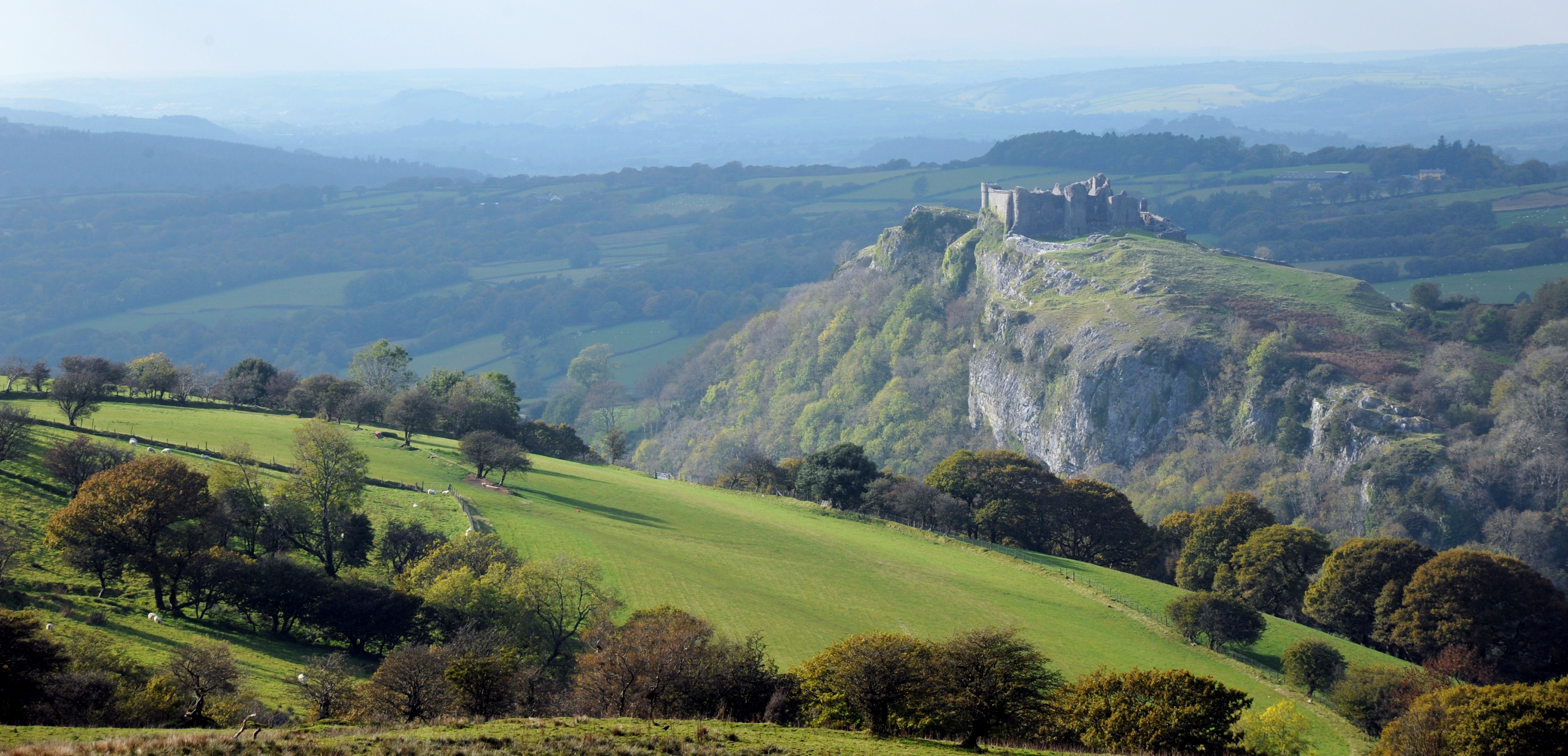
- The south-east wall and cliff face of Carreg Cennen Castle

Site information
- Condition: Ruined
- Website: Castell Carreg Cennen (Cadw)

Location
- Location of the castle within Carmarthenshire
- Coordinates: 51.8544°N 3.9354°W
- Grid reference: grid reference SN66841911 Postcode: SA19 6UA

Site history
- Materials: local Carboniferous Limestone
- Battles/wars: Surrendered to Owain Glyndŵr following a siege.
- Events: Demolition by Yorkists in Wars of the Roses

Listed Building – Grade I

Carreg Cennen Castle (Welsh: Castell Carreg Cennen) is a castle sited on a high rocky outcrop overlooking the River Cennen, close to the village of Trap, four miles south east of Llandeilo in Carmarthenshire, Wales. Castell Carreg Cennen means castle on a rock next to (the river) Cennen, the river name itself being a reference either to cen meaning lichen or perhaps a personal name.

The dramatic limestone precipice was originally the site of a native Welsh castle, possibly constructed by The Lord Rhys (d. 1197), although any remains of this castle have been subsumed by later English work. In 1277, during the conquest of Wales by Edward I, the English gained control of the castle. It was briefly retaken by Welsh forces in 1282, but was back under English control by the following year, when it was granted to the English baron John Giffard (d. 1299). The castle was unsuccessfully besieged by Owain Glyndŵr during the Welsh Revolt. During the Wars of the Roses it was surrendered to the Yorkists and slighted in 1462 to prevent further use.

The castle visible today was probably constructed by John Giffard and his son John (d. 1322). It is situated within the Brecon Beacons National Park and is now in the care of Cadw, the Welsh Government historic environment service.

== Description ==
Carreg Cennen Castle consists of a strongly-walled and towered square court. There are six towers, all of different shapes, including a great twin-towered gatehouse on the north side. A range of apartments on the east side of the inner court, or ward, includes a hall, kitchens, chapel, and the so-called 'King's Chamber'. This chamber has a well-carved stone fireplace, and traceried windows, one facing into the courtyard, the other outwards commanding impressive views to the south. These date from the late 13th or early 14th century.

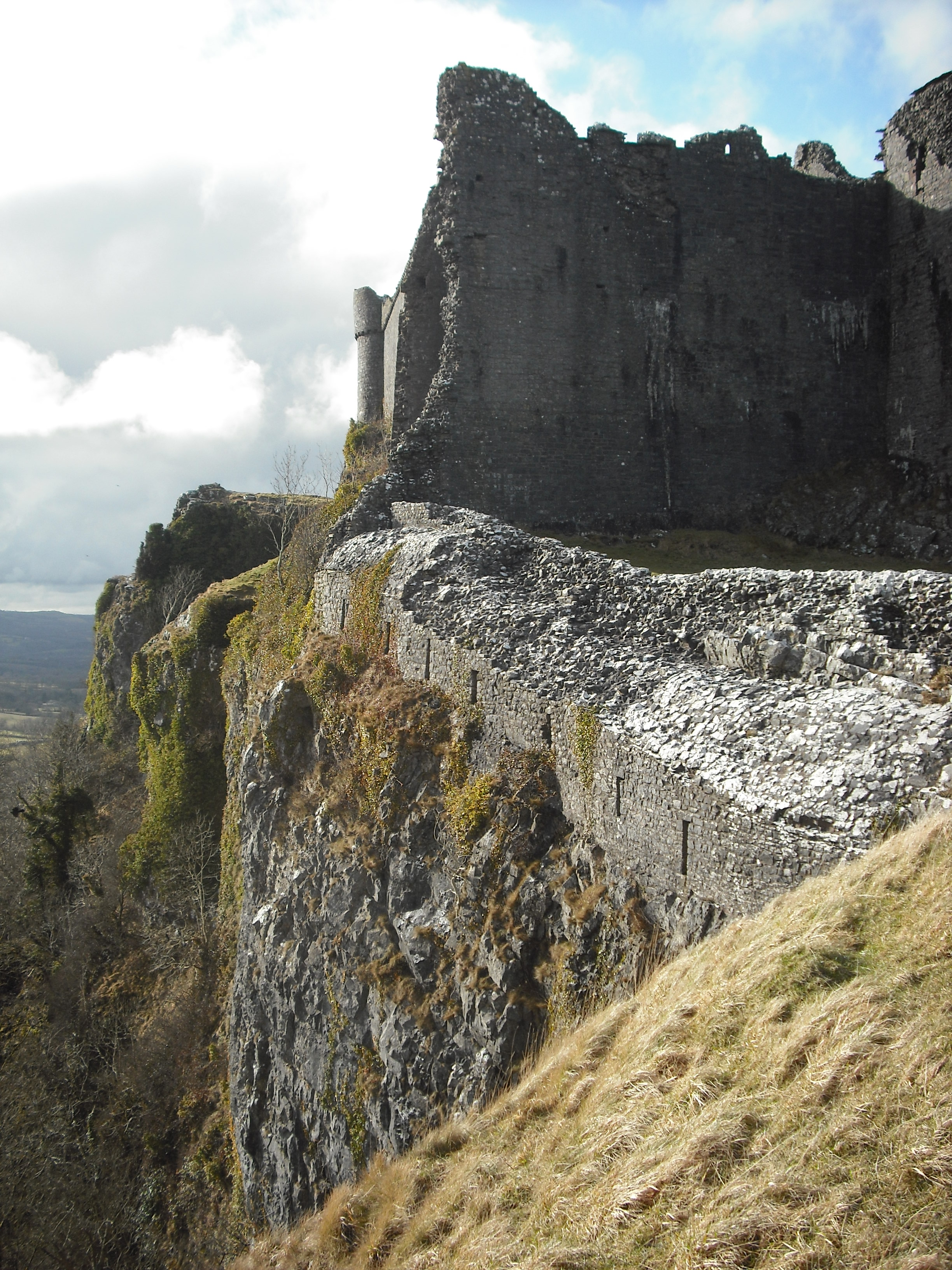
The cliff below the castle, and the windows of the passage to the cave

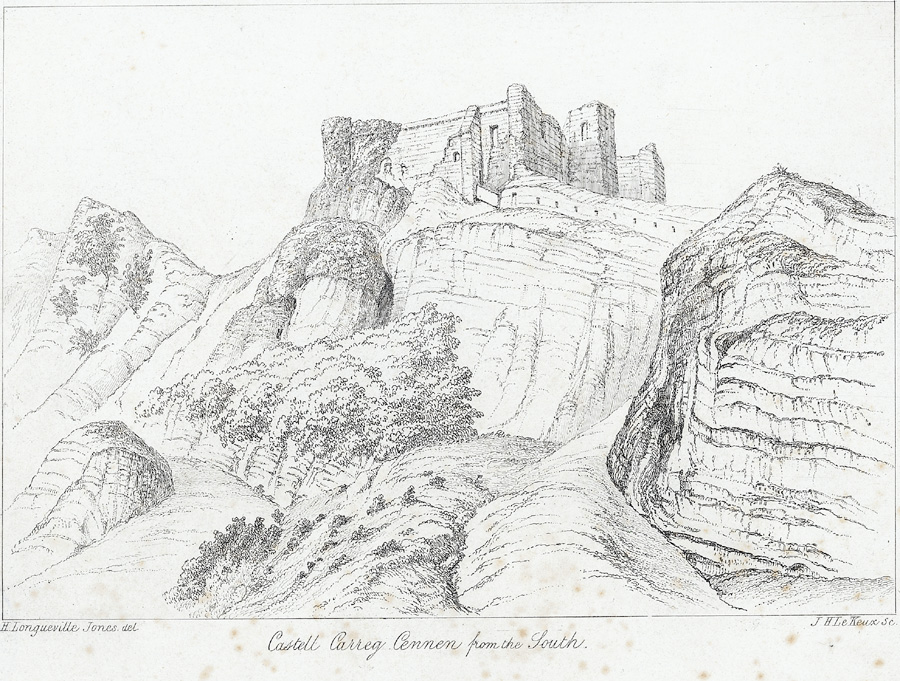
The castle from the South, c. 1830

The castle is protected by limestone cliffs to the south and rock-cut ditches to the west. To the north and east there is an outer ward, and within that a barbican, gatehouse. Three drawbridges over deep pits protected the access to the inner ward. In the south-east corner of the inner ward steps lead to a vaulted passage and a natural cave beneath the castle, which leads deep into the hillside. A freshwater spring rises in the cave, which would have been a useful supplement during dry weather when the castle would have had difficulty harvesting rainwater in filling the rainwater cisterns. The castle is under the care of Cadw, who have stabilised and, to a limited extent, restored some of the remains. The castle is accessed via a steep climb up the hill from Castell Farm, which is near the car park. A large threshing barn has been converted to tearooms and a shop, whilst the majority of the farm buildings, around a traditional farmyard, retain their agricultural purposes. Since 1982 these have been part of a farm park with rare and unusual breeds of cows and sheep. This castle did not have a keep as such; the gatehouse acted as the castle's keep because this was the tallest part of the Castell Carreg.

== Geology ==
The Carreg Cennen Disturbance, a zone of ancient geological faults and folds stretching from Pembrokeshire to Shropshire, gains its name from this location where it is most impressively revealed. The rocky outcrop on which the castle is perched is an isolated block of Carboniferous Limestone trapped within two faults which form a part of the disturbance. In contrast, the immediately surrounding countryside is underlain by Old Red Sandstone. This disturbance is probably also responsible for the alignment of the Afon Cennen to the west of this location where the river follows the line of the fault for over 2.5 mi / 4 km because firstly glaciers during the Ice Age then more recently the river have found it easier to erode these deformed rocks.

== Prehistoric evidence ==
Human remains found in a cave inside the limestone rock date human activity here back to prehistoric times. The site may have also been an Iron Age hillfort.

Roman coins from the 1st and 2nd century have also been found, although it is unlikely the Romans occupied this site on a permanent basis.

== Welsh period ==
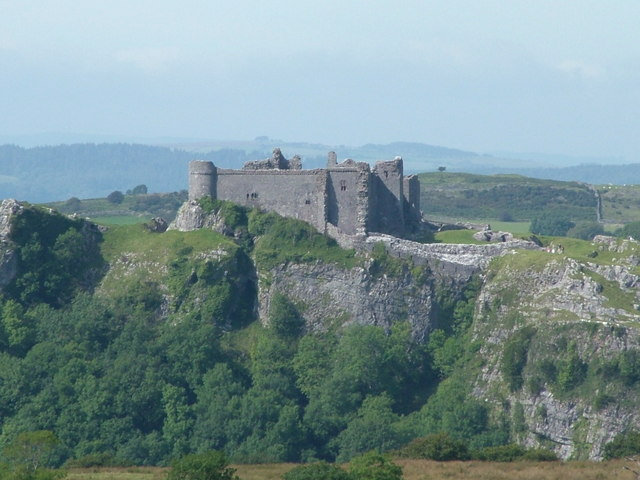
Carreg Cennen Castle, Wales, south facing view

The first masonry castle was probably built by The Lord Rhys, and remained a possession of the Deheubarth dynasty for the next 50 years. The earliest documented mention of the castle is 1248, when Brut y Tywysogion records that Rhys Fychan ap Rhys Mechyll's mother, Matilda de Braose, granted the castle to the Norman English to spite her son, but before the English took possession of it Rhys captured the castle.

For the next 30 years it changed hands frequently between Rhys and his uncle Maredudd, who were fighting for control of the Kingdom of Deheubarth. In 1277, at the start of the conquest of Wales by Edward I, the Welsh lords of the region sided with Edward against the Welsh leader Llywelyn ap Gruffudd and the castle was handed over to the English. Documents show that some repairs were subsequently made. In 1282, a second phase of fighting began and the local Welsh nobles switched sides, joining the widespread Welsh rebellion and seizing control of the castle. By the following year it was back in English hands.

== English period ==
In 1283 Edward I granted the castle to John Giffard, the commander of the English troops at Cilmeri where Llywelyn ap Gruffudd was killed. Giffard was probably responsible for the remodelled castle we see today and it is likely the work was completed under his son, John. Reconstruction occurred in three phases, with the inner ward and gatehouse completed first, followed by the barbican and outer ward; similarities in construction suggest these phases were completed within a short timespan of each other. The south curtain wall may have retained masonry from the earlier Welsh castle. The lack of royal accounts and King Edward's decision not to visit the castle during his tour of Wales in 1284 imply that the Giffard family was responsible for funding the building work.

Rhys ap Maredudd briefly captured Carreg Cennen during a rebellion against English rule in 1287, although he did not retain control of the castle for long. The castle remained in the ownership of the Giffards until 1322. It then came into the possession of the Duchy of Lancaster and building records from 1369-70 show that significant repairs were carried out. With the accession of Henry IV to the throne in 1399, the castle passed to the Crown.

=== Glyndŵr rebellion ===
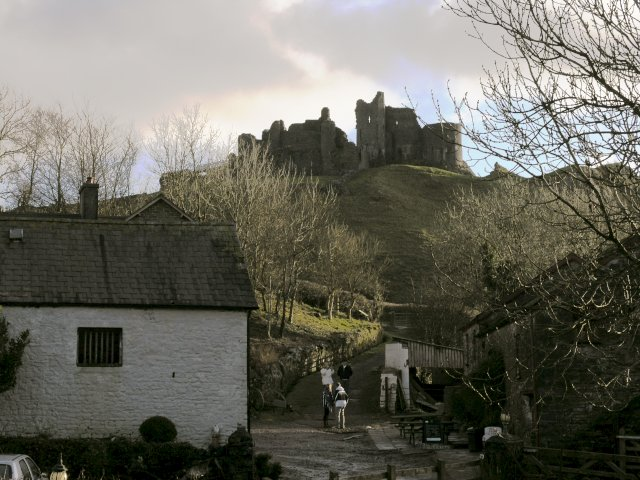
Carreg Cennen Castle, Wales, view from the road

In early July 1403 Owain Glyndŵr, together with 800 men, attacked Carreg Cennen, but, although inflicting severe damage to the walls, failed to take the castle. It was defended against Glyndwr's forces by Sir John Scudamore of Herefordshire, who was to marry Alys ferch Owain Glyndŵr, one of Glyndwr's daughters just a few years later. Owain was himself present for the siege which lasted for several months. Major repair work was needed in the aftermath of the siege, and a large sum – more than £500 – was spent on the castle between 1414 and 1421.

=== Wars of the Roses ===
By the mid-fifteenth century, the castle's custodian was Gruffudd ap Nicolas and Carreg Cennen became a Lancastrian stronghold during the Wars of the Roses. The gun port in the north-west tower was likely added at this time for the use of muskets. The Yorkist victory at the Battle of Mortimer's Cross in 1461 forced Gruffudd's sons to surrender the castle. The Yorkists subsequently set about demolishing (slighting) the castle with a team of 500 men.

== Recent history ==
Ownership of the castle passed to the Vaughan and Cawdor families, and from the 18th century it started to attract artists. J. M. W. Turner painted the castle in 1798. The second Earl Cawdor began an extensive renovation in the 19th century, and in 1932 Carreg Cennen was given to the guardianship of the Office of Works. In the 1960s Carreg Cennen Castle was acquired by the Morris family of Castell Farm, when Lord Cawdor's legal team made a mistake in the wording of the deeds and included the castle as part of the farm. Today, the castle remains privately owned by Margaret and Bernard Llewellyn, daughter and son in law of the late Mr. Gwilim Morris. The castle is now maintained by Cadw. It is open daily from 9.30am to 5.00pm between April and October and 9.30 to 4.30pm between November and March (closed Christmas Day). Since 2024, Cadw have used the Welsh name Castell Carreg Cennen in English, as part of an effort to standardise the names in both languages.

== Gallery ==
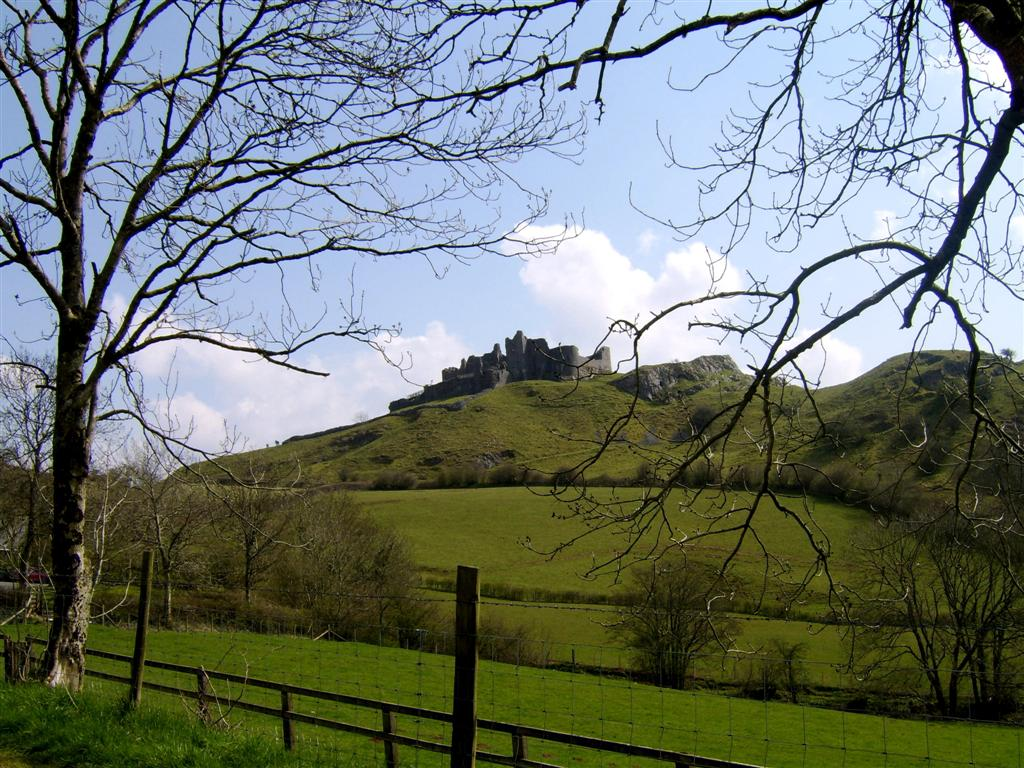
View from the field when arriving

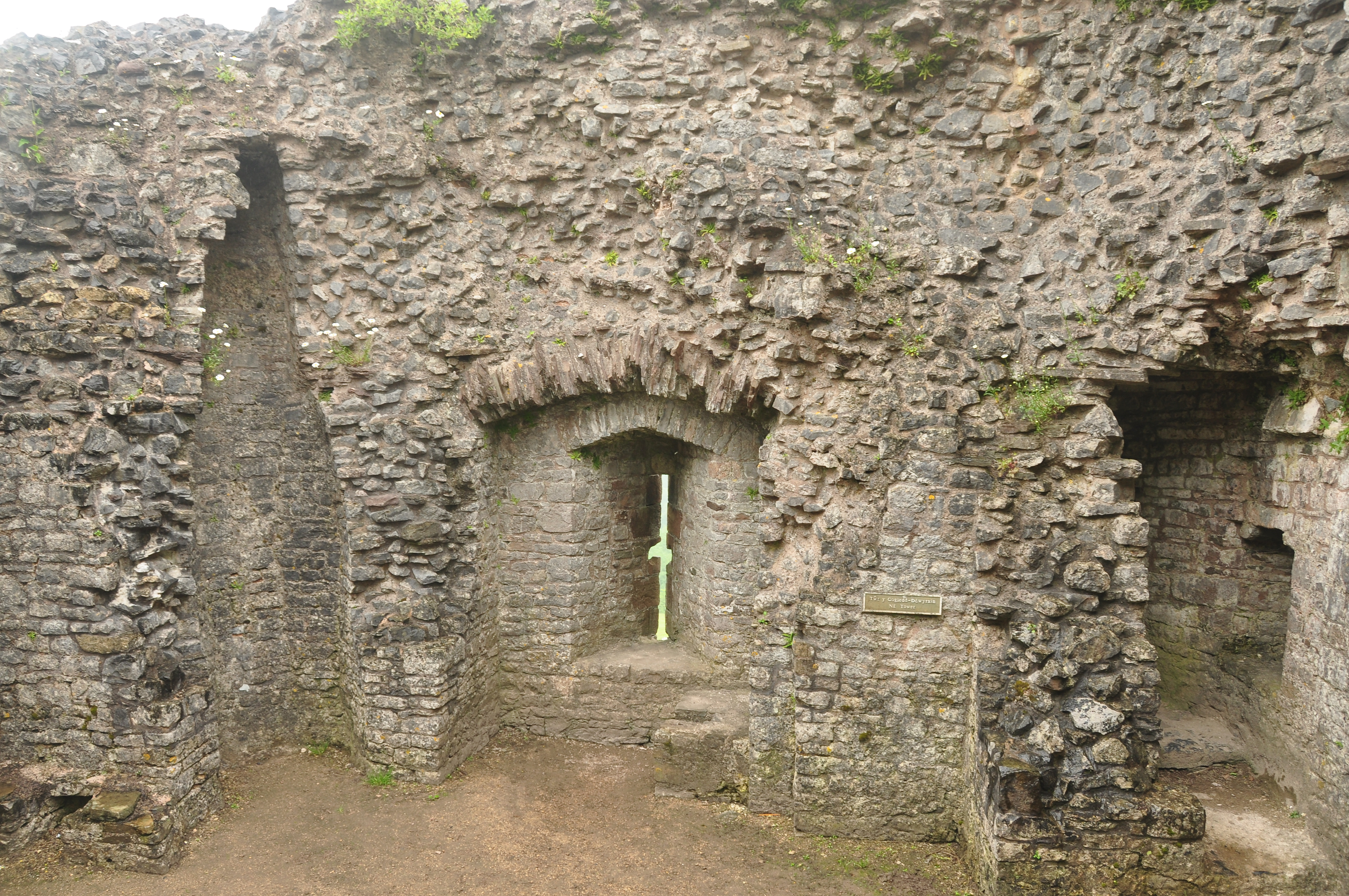
View of the Arrowslit

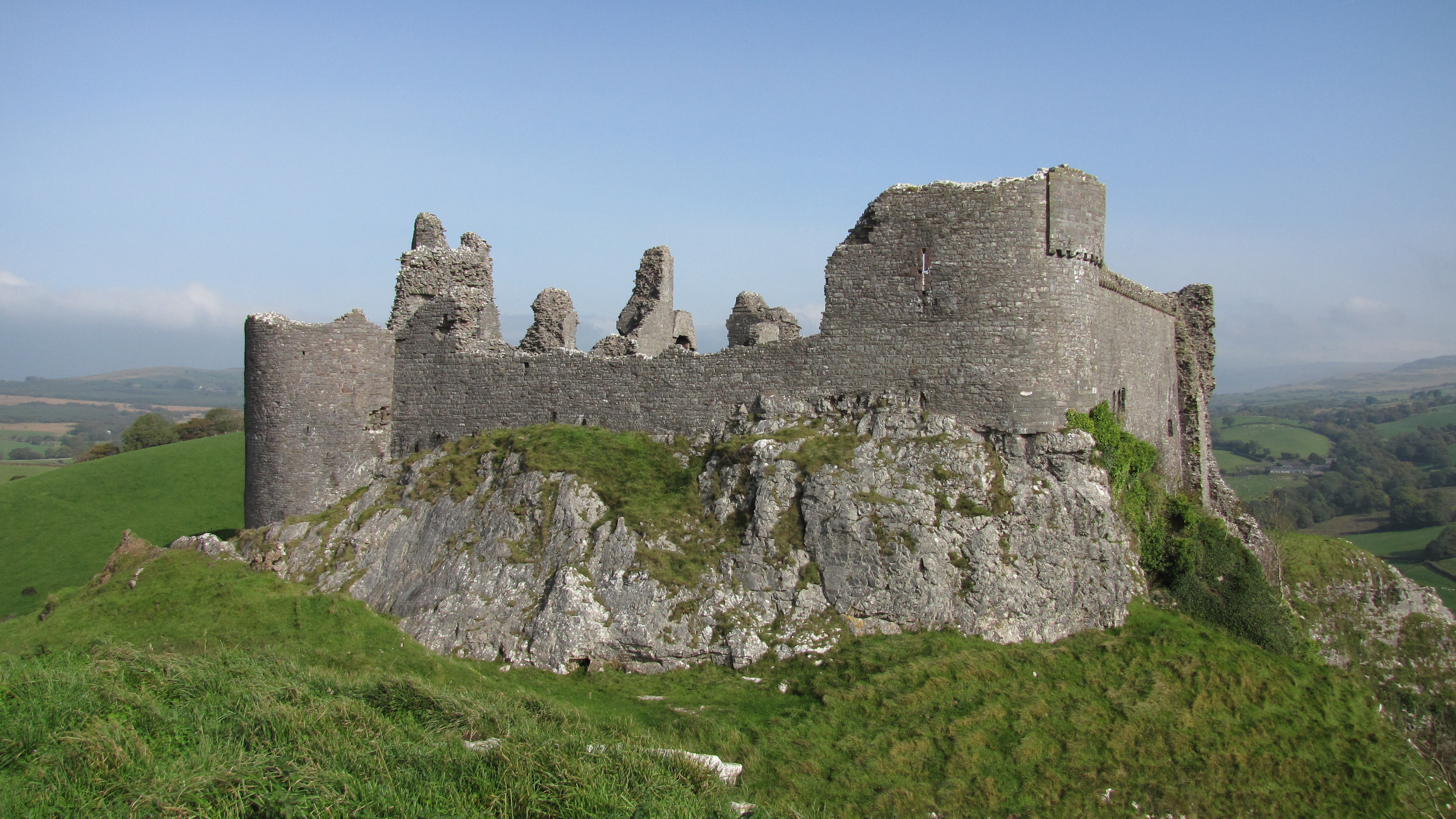
View of the rocky outcrop from the west side

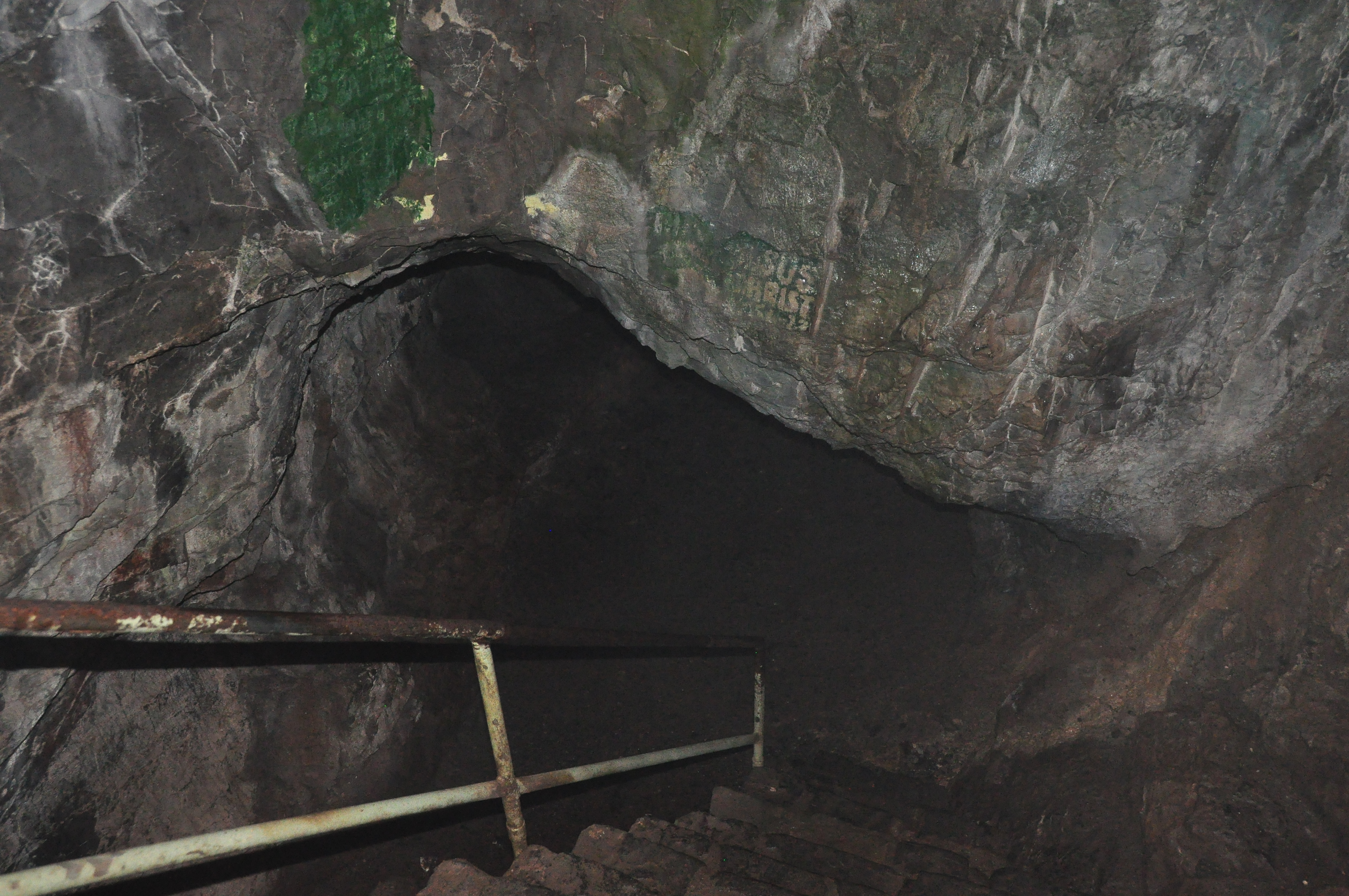
Entrance to the cave under the Castle

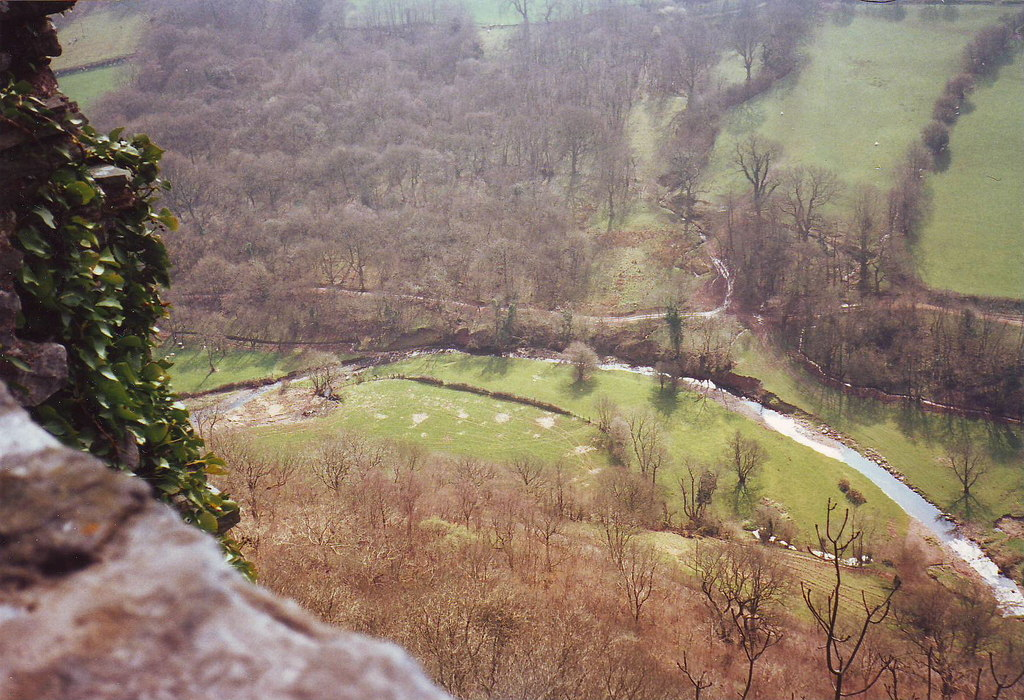
View from the Castle overlooking the River Cennen

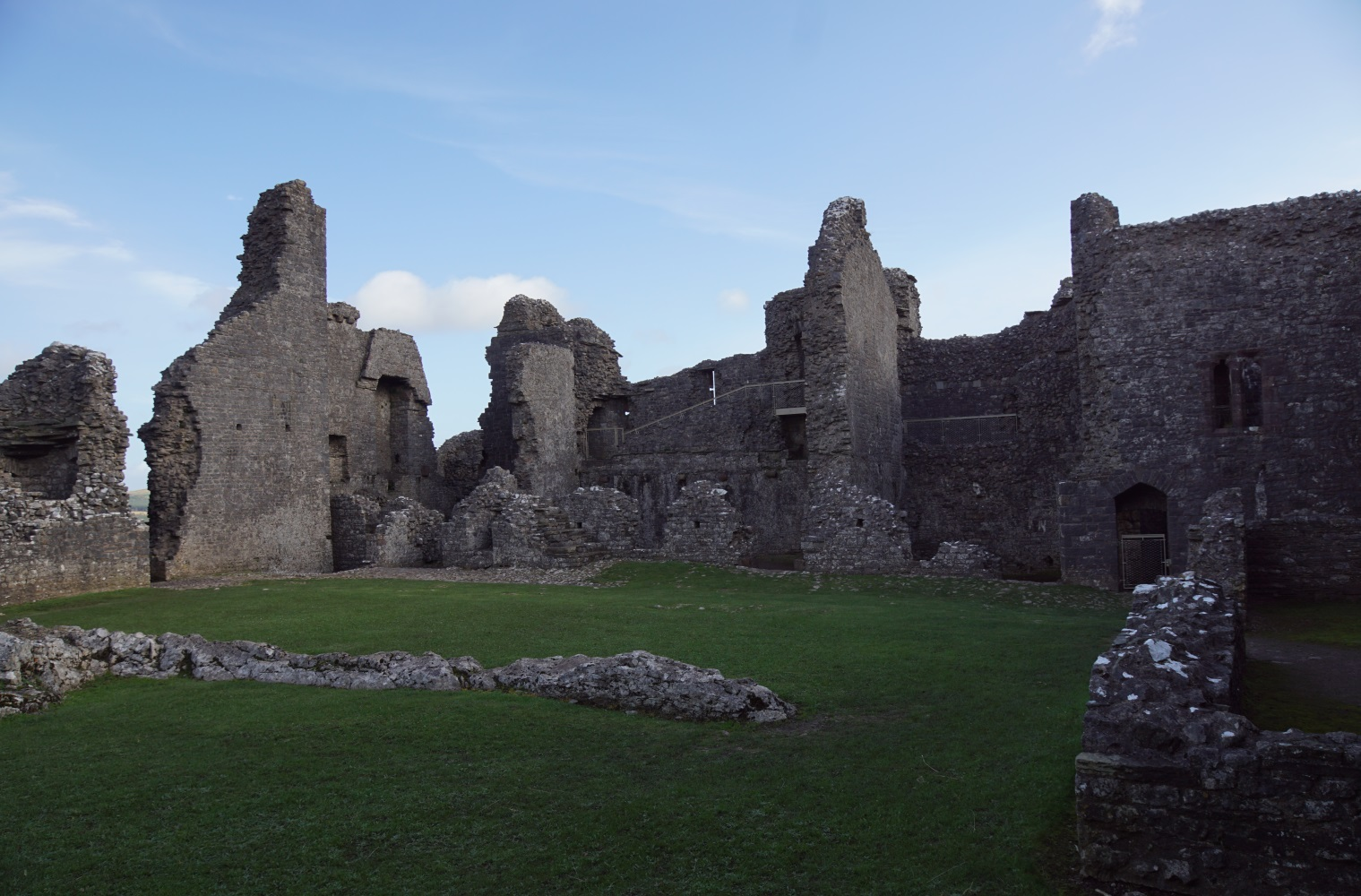
Inner courtyard in a ruinous state

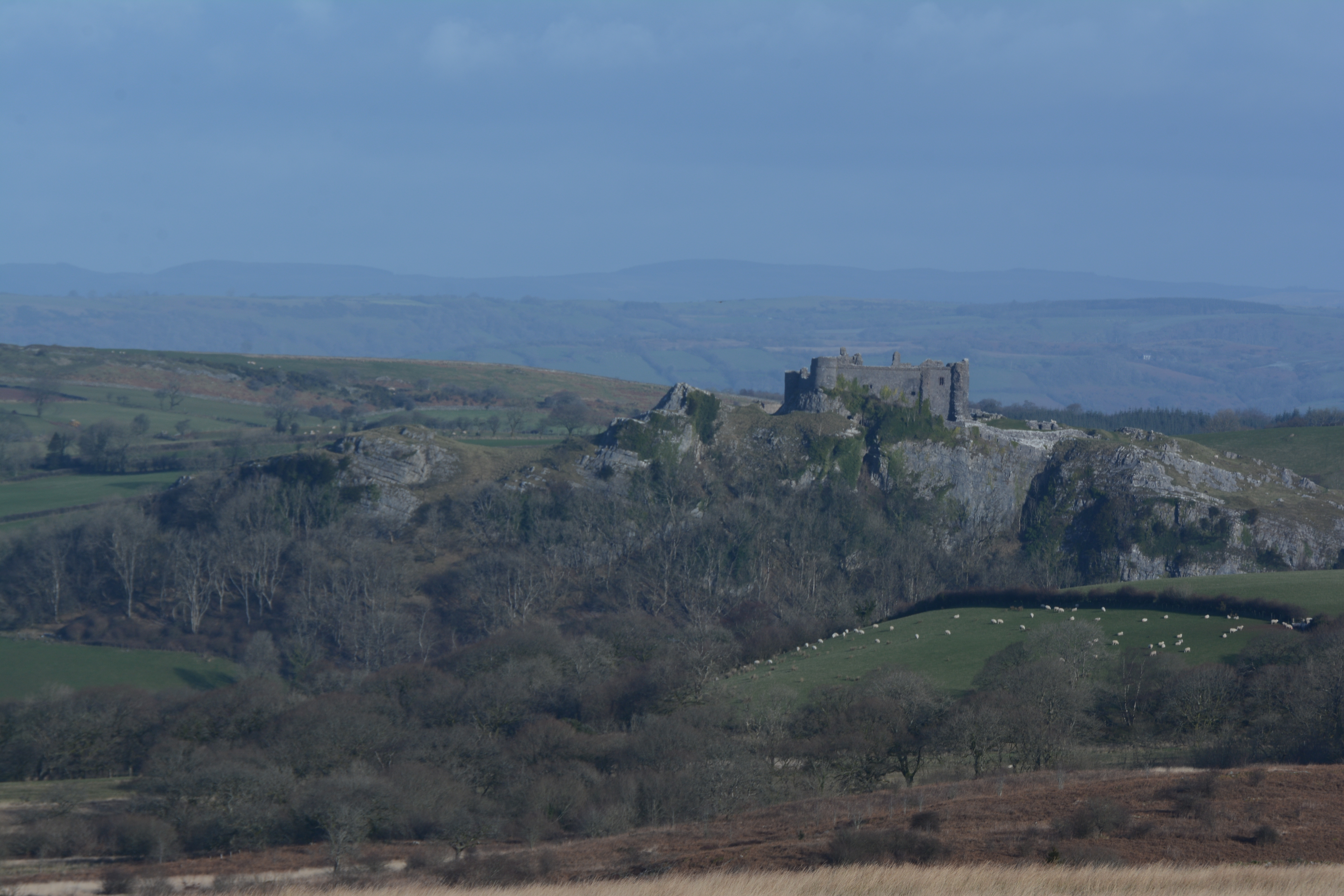
View over the whole rocky outcrop

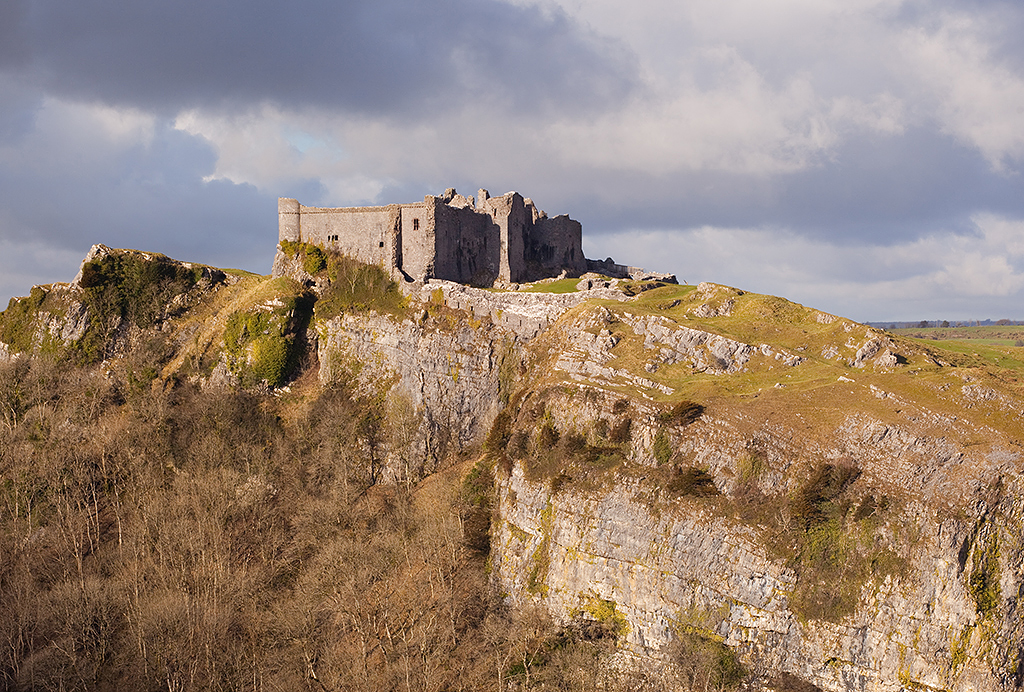
Castle's cliff as we move upward

== See also ==
- Castles in Great Britain and Ireland
- List of Cadw properties
- List of castles in Wales
- The Gauntlet, a children's historical novel set at Carreg Cennen Castle

== Bibliography ==
- Davis, Paul R. (2021). Towers of Defiance: Castles and Fortifications of the Welsh Princes (1st ed.). Talybont, Ceredigion: Y Lolfa. ISBN 978-1-912631-30-8.
- Llewellyn, Bernard (2006). "Castell Farm". In Lewis, J.M. (ed.). Carreg Cennen Castle. Cardiff: Cadw: Welsh Historic Monuments. ISBN 1-85760-237-4.
- Lewis, J.M. (2006). Carreg Cennen Castle. Cardiff: Cadw: Welsh Historic Monuments. ISBN 1-85760-237-4.
- Lloyd, T.; Orbach, J.; Scourfield, R. (2006). Carmarthenshire and Ceredigion. Yale University Press.
- Morgan, Gerald (2008). Castles in Wales: a Handbook. Tal-y-bont: Y Lolfa. ISBN 978-1-84771-031-4.
- Pillay, Ruven (1977). "BGS Geological Map Sheet 230". webapps.bgs.ac.uk. British Geological Survey.
- "Carreg Cennen Castle & Farm". www.carregcennencastle.com.
- "Carreg Cennen". Ingot. Richard Thomas and Baldwins, house journal of the Welsh steelworks. March 1956. "...most romantically situated of all Welsh castles..."
