= Percy F. Westerman =

English author (1876–1959)

- Born: 1876; Portsmouth, England
- Died: 22 February 1959 (aged 82–83)
- Education: Portsmouth Grammar School
- Occupation: Author
- Spouse: Florence Wager (1900–death)
- Children: John F.C. Westerman (son)
- Writing career
- Genre: Children's literature
- Notable work: King of Kilba

Percy Francis Westerman (1876 – 22 February 1959) was an English author of children's literature, with a prolific output. Many of his books are adventure stories with military and naval themes.

== Biography ==
He was born in Portsmouth, England in 1876, and educated at Portsmouth Grammar School, before taking up a clerical appointment at Portsmouth Dockyard at the age of twenty. He married Florence Wager, of Portsmouth, in 1900. Always keen sailors, they spent part of their honeymoon sailing in the Solent. Their son, John F.C. Westerman, born in 1901, also wrote adventure books for boys.

At the age of 70 he was reluctantly forced by a fall to leave his houseboat for dry land, but he continued writing apace. He died at the age of 82, and his last book, Mistaken Identity, was published posthumously in 1959.

== Writing career ==
His writing career allegedly began with a sixpence bet made with his wife that he could write a better story than the one he was reading to his son, who was at the time ill with chickenpox.

His first book for boys, A Lad of Grit, was published by Blackie and Son Limited in 1908. In the same year, Baden-Powell founded the Scouting movement, which strongly influenced many of Westerman's books – he was a particularly keen supporter of the Sea Scouts.

He published a further three books in 1911, which were so successful that he gave up his Admiralty appointment that year to become a full-time author. He lived on board a houseboat – a converted Thames barge – on the River Frome at Wareham in Dorset, where he wrote the majority of his books.

An early book, The Flying Submarine (published in 1912) may indicate Westerman's genre. This boys' adventure novel was about a mysterious man from a South American country. He was an inventor, who had discovered a new kind of lighter-than-air gas that he called "helia", which was much lighter than helium or hydrogen. He used helia in many inventions, including back-packs that could help a man float in the air or fly upwards, and in the remarkable titular submarine that could, when enough helia was used, fly! Eventually he used his flying submarine to win a war between his South American country and its belligerent neighbour.

It is highly likely that Westerman derived the idea for this super-weapon from Jules Verne's Terror, the speedboat, submarine, automobile, or aircraft superweapon invented by Verne's arch-hero Robur in Master of the World and The Clipper of the Clouds.

Similarly Westerman's South American conflict reflects the wars between Paraguay and Uruguay.

During the First World War, he was initially employed on coastal duties by the Royal Navy, but in 1918 he was commissioned, like W. E. Johns, in the Royal Flying Corps, as an instructor of navigation. During the Second World War he commanded the Arne platoon of the 7th Dorset Home Guard battalion (Wareham) from June 1940 until 26 December 1942. He wrote to Blackie of his service in the two wars that "neither appointment seriously interfered with my literary output."

During the 1930s Westerman was voted the most popular author of stories for boys. His books sold over one and a half million copies in his lifetime (total sales at his death were 1,599,000). He published at least 174 books, with 12 different firms.

== Bibliography ==
Publication dates as listed by the British Library. Many titles were reissued subsequently, some several times.

No.	Title	Subtitle	Publisher	Place	Year	Illustrator	Notes
1	A Lad of Grit		Blackie and Son Ltd.	London and Glasgow	1908	Edward S. Hodgson	Project Gutenberg
2	The Young Cavalier		C. Arthur Pearson	London	1909	Gordon Browne	Project Gutenberg
3	The Winning of the Golden Spurs		James Nisbet and Co.	London	1911		(Note: 'The Winning of the Golden Spurs was first searialised in Young England in 1910. The book was illustrated but the name of the illustrator was not stated. However, they were said to be an artist of established reputation.)Project Gutenberg
4	The Quest of the "Golden Hope"	A seventeenth century story of adventure	Blackie and Son Ltd.	London and Glasgow	1912	Frank E. Wiles	Project Gutenberg
5	The Flying Submarine		James Nisbet and Co.	London	1912		Faded Page
6	Captured at Tripoli		Blackie and Son Ltd.	London and Glasgow	1912	Charles M. Sheldon	Project Gutenberg
7	The Sea Monarch		Adam and Charles Black	London	1912	Edward S. Hodgson	(Note: This story was first serialised in Volume XXV of The Captain from April to September 1911.)Project Gutenberg
8	The Scouts of Seal Island		Adam and Charles Black	London	1913	Ernest Prater	Project Gutenberg
9	The Rival Submarines		S. W. Partridge and Co.	London	1913	C. Fleming Williams	Project Gutenberg
10	The Stolen Cruiser		Jarrold and Sons	London	1913		Project Gutenberg
11	When East Meets West	A story of the yellow peril	Blackie and Son Ltd.	London and Glasgow	1913	C. M. Padday	
12	Under King Henry's Banners	A story of the days of Agincourt	Pilgrim Press	London	1913	John Campbell	(Note: Under King Henry's Banners was reviewed by the Westminster Gazette on 16 December 1913.)Project Gutenberg
13	The Log of a Snob		Chapman and Hall	London	1914	W. Edward Wigfull	(Note: This was the first of over twenty book by Westerman which Wigfull illustrated.)
14	The Sea-Girt Fortress	A story of Heligoland	Blackie and Son Ltd.	London and Glasgow	1914	W. E. Wigfull	Project Gutenberg
15	The Sea Scouts of the "Petrel"		Adam and Charles Black	London	1914		
16	'Gainst the Might of Spain	A story of the days of the Great Armada	Pilgrim Press	London	1914		
17	Building the Empire	A story of the North-West Frontier	Jarrold and Sons	London	1914		
18	The Dreadnought of the Air		S. W. Partridge and Co.	London	1914		Project Gutenberg
19	The Dispatch-Riders		Blackie and Son Ltd.	London and Glasgow	1915		Project Gutenberg
20	The Nameless Island	A story of some modern Robinson Crusoes	C. Arthur Pearson	London	1915		Project Gutenberg
21	The Fight for Constantinople	A story of the Gallipoli Peninsula	Blackie and Son Ltd.	London and Glasgow	1915		Project Gutenberg
22	A Sub. of the R.N.R.		S. W. Partridge and Co.	London	1915		Project Gutenberg
23	Rounding up the Raider	A naval story of the Great War	Blackie and Son Ltd.	London and Glasgow	1916	Edward S. Hodgson	Project Gutenberg
24	The Secret Battleplane		Blackie and Son Ltd.	London and Glasgow	1916	Ernest Prater	Project Gutenberg
25	The Treasure of the "San Philipo"		Religious Tract Society / Boy's Own Paper	London	1916		Project Gutenberg
26	A Watch-dog of the North Sea		S. W. Partridge and Co.	London	1916	C. M. Padday	Project Gutenberg
27	Deeds of Pluck and Daring in the Great War		Blackie and Son Ltd.	London and Glasgow	1917		
28	To the Fore with the Tanks!		S. W. Partridge and Co.	London	1918		Project Gutenberg
29	Under the White Ensign	A naval story of the Great War	Blackie and Son Ltd.	London and Glasgow	1918	Edward S. Hodgson	Project Gutenberg
30	The Fritz-Strafers		S. W. Partridge and Co.	London	1918		(Note: Reissued as The Keepers of the Narrow Seas, 1931)Project Gutenberg
31	Billy Barcroft, R.N.A.S.	A story of the Great War	S. W. Partridge and Co.	London	1918		Project Gutenberg
32	A Lively Bit of the Front		Blackie and Son Ltd.	London and Glasgow	1918		Project Gutenberg
33	The Secret Channel and Other Stories of the Great War		Adam and Charles Black	London	1918	Edward S. Hodgson	
34	The Submarine Hunters		Blackie and Son Ltd.	London and Glasgow	1918	Edward S. Hodgson	Project Gutenberg
35	With Beatty off Jutland	A romance of the great sea fight	Blackie and Son Ltd.	London and Glasgow	1918		Project Gutenberg
36	Wilmshurst of the Frontier Force	A story of the conquest of German East Africa	S. W. Partridge and Co.	London	1918	Ernest Prater	Project Gutenberg
37	A Sub. And a Submarine		Blackie and Son Ltd.	London and Glasgow	1919	Edward S. Hodgson	Faded Page / Project Gutenberg
38	Winning his Wings	A story of the R.A.F.	Blackie and Son Ltd.	London and Glasgow	1919		Project Gutenberg
39	The Thick of the Fray at Zeebrugge: April 1918		Blackie and Son Ltd.	London and Glasgow	1919	W. Edward Wigfull	Project Gutenberg
40	Midst Arctic Perils		C. Arthur Pearson	London	1919		Project Gutenberg
41	The Airship "Golden Hind"		S. W. Partridge and Co.	London	1920		Project Gutenberg
42	The Mystery Ship	A naval story of the Great War	S. W. Partridge and Co.	London	1920		Project Gutenberg
43	The Salving of the "Fusi Yama"	A post-war story of the sea	Blackie and Son Ltd.	London and Glasgow	1920	Edward S. Hodgson	Project Gutenberg
44	Sea Scouts All	How the "Olivette" was won	Blackie and Son Ltd.	London and Glasgow	1920		Project Gutenberg
45	Sea Scouts Abroad	Further adventures of the "Olivette"	Blackie and Son Ltd.	London and Glasgow	1921		Project Gutenberg
46	The Third Officer	A present-day pirate story	Blackie and Son Ltd.	London and Glasgow	1921	Edward S. Hodgson	Project Gutenberg
47	Sea Scouts Up-Channel		Blackie and Son Ltd.	London and Glasgow	1922		Project Gutenberg
48	The Wireless Officer		Blackie and Son Ltd.	London and Glasgow	1922		Project Gutenberg
49	The War of the Wireless Waves		Oxford University Press & Humphrey Milford	London	1923		
50	The Pirate Submarine		James Nisbet and Co.	London	1923		Project Gutenberg
51	A Cadet of the Mercantile Marine		Blackie and Son Ltd.	London and Glasgow	1923	W. Edward Wigfull	
52	Clipped Wings		Blackie and Son Ltd.	London and Glasgow	1923	Edward S. Hodgson	Project Gutenberg
53	The Mystery of Stockmere School		S. W. Partridge and Co.	London	1924		
54	Sinclair's Luck	A story of adventure in East Africa	S. W. Partridge and Co.	London	1924		
55	Captain Cain		James Nisbet and Co.	London	1924		Faded Page
56	The Good Ship "Golden Effort"		Blackie and Son Ltd.	London and Glasgow	1924		
57	The Treasure of the Sacred Lake		C. Arthur Pearson	London	1924		
58	Unconquered Wings		Blackie and Son Ltd.	London and Glasgow	1924		
59	Clinton's Quest		C. Arthur Pearson	London	1925		
60	East in the "Golden Gain"		Blackie and Son Ltd.	London and Glasgow	1925	R F Hilder	
61	The Boys of the "Puffin"		S. W. Partridge and Co.	London	1925	G. W. Goss	Project Gutenberg
62	The Buccaneers of Boya		Blackie and Son Ltd.	London and Glasgow	1925		Faded Page
63	The Sea Scouts of the "Kestrel"		Seeley, Service and Co.	London	1926		Faded Page
64	Annesley's Double		Adam and Charles Black	London	1926		Faded Page
65	King of Kilba		Ward, Lock & Co.	London and Melbourne	1926		
66	The Luck of the "Golden Dawn"		Blackie and Son Ltd.	London and Glasgow	1926		
67	The Riddle of the Air		Blackie and Son Ltd.	London and Glasgow	1926	R F Hilder	
68	The Terror of the Seas		Ward, Lock & Co.	London and Melbourne	1927		
69	Mystery Island		Oxford University Press & Humphrey Milford	London	1927		Faded Page
70	Captain Blundell's Treasure		Blackie and Son Ltd.	London and Glasgow	1927		
71	Chums of the "Golden Vanity"		Blackie and Son Ltd.	London and Glasgow	1927	R F Hilder	Faded Page
72	In the Clutches of the Dyaks		S. W. Partridge and Co.	London	1927		Faded Page
73	The Junior Cadet		Blackie and Son Ltd.	London and Glasgow	1928		(Note: Reissued as Norman goes to Sea, 1934)
74	On the Wings of the Wind		Blackie and Son Ltd.	London and Glasgow	1928		
75	A Shanghai Adventure		Blackie and Son Ltd.	London and Glasgow	1928		
76	Pat Stobart in the "Golden Dawn"		Blackie and Son Ltd.	London and Glasgow	1929		
77	Rivals of the Reef		Blackie and Son Ltd.	London and Glasgow	1929	Kenneth Inns	
78	Captain Starlight		Blackie and Son Ltd.	London and Glasgow	1929		
79	Captain Sang		Blackie and Son Ltd.	London and Glasgow	1930		
80	Leslie Dexter, Cadet		Blackie and Son Ltd.	London and Glasgow	1930		
81	A Mystery of the Broads		Blackie and Son Ltd.	London and Glasgow	1930		
82	The Secret of the Plateau		Blackie and Son Ltd.	London and Glasgow	1931		
83	The Senior Cadet		Blackie and Son Ltd.	London and Glasgow	1931		
84	In Defiance of the Ban		Blackie and Son Ltd.	London and Glasgow	1931		Faded Page
85	The Amir's Ruby		Blackie and Son Ltd.	London and Glasgow	1932		Faded Page
86	'All Hands to the Boats'		Blackie and Son Ltd.	London and Glasgow	1932		
87	Captain Fosdyke's Gold		Blackie and Son Ltd.	London and Glasgow	1932	Edward S. Hodgson	
88	King for a Month		Blackie and Son Ltd.	London and Glasgow	1933		
89	Rocks Ahead!		Blackie and Son Ltd.	London and Glasgow	1933		
90	The White Arab		Blackie and Son Ltd.	London and Glasgow	1933		
91	The Disappearing Dhow		Blackie and Son Ltd.	London and Glasgow	1933		Faded Page
92	Chasing the "Pleiad"	The Mystery of the S.S. Aracluta	Blackie and Son Ltd.	London and Glasgow	1933		
93	Tales of the Sea		R. Tuck and Sons	London	1934	Terence T. Cuneo	(Note: with C. Gilson et al.)
94	The Westow Talisman		Blackie and Son Ltd.	London and Glasgow	1934		
95	Andy-All-Alone		Blackie and Son Ltd.	London and Glasgow	1934		
96	The Black Hawk		Blackie and Son Ltd.	London and Glasgow	1934		
97	Standish of the Air Police		Blackie and Son Ltd.	London and Glasgow	1935		
98	Sleuths of the Air		Blackie and Son Ltd.	London and Glasgow	1935		Faded Page
99	On Board the "Golden Effort"		Blackie and Son Ltd.	London and Glasgow	1935		
100	The Call of the Sea		Blackie and Son Ltd.	London and Glasgow	1935		
101	The Red Pirate		Blackie and Son Ltd.	London and Glasgow	1935	Rowland Hilder	
102	Tireless Wings		Blackie and Son Ltd.	London and Glasgow	1936	Comerford Watson	
103	Captain Flick		Blackie and Son Ltd.	London and Glasgow	1936	Edward S. Hodgson	
104	His First Ship		Blackie and Son Ltd.	London and Glasgow	1936		
105	Midshipman Raxworthy		Blackie and Son Ltd.	London and Glasgow	1936	Edward S. Hodgson	Faded Page
106	Ringed by Fire		Blackie and Son Ltd.	London and Glasgow	1936		
107	The Pearl Fishers and Other Stories		R. Tuck and Sons	London	1936		(Note: With Major John Thomas Gorman et al.)
108	Winged Might		Blackie and Son Ltd.	London and Glasgow	1937		
109	Under Fire in Spain		Blackie and Son Ltd.	London and Glasgow	1937	Ernest Prater	
110	The Last of the Buccaneers		Blackie and Son Ltd.	London and Glasgow	1937		
111	Haunted Harbour		Blackie and Son Ltd.	London and Glasgow	1937		
112	His Unfinished Voyage		Blackie and Son Ltd.	London and Glasgow	1937		
113	Midshipman Webb's Treasure		Blackie and Son Ltd.	London and Glasgow	1937	D. L. Mays	
114	Cadet Alan Carr		Blackie and Son Ltd.	London and Glasgow	1938	D. L. Mays	
115	Standish Gets his Man		Blackie and Son Ltd.	London and Glasgow	1938	W. Edward Wigfull	Faded Page
116	Standish Loses his Man		Blackie and Son Ltd.	London and Glasgow	1939	W. Edward Wigfull	
117	In Eastern Seas		Blackie and Son Ltd.	London and Glasgow	1939		
118	The Bulldog Breed		Blackie and Son Ltd.	London and Glasgow	1939	E. Boye Uden	
119	At Grips with the Swastika		Blackie and Son Ltd.	London and Glasgow	1940	Leo Bates	
120	Eagles' Talons		Blackie and Son Ltd.	London and Glasgow	1940		
121	In Dangerous Waters		Blackie and Son Ltd.	London and Glasgow	1940		
122	Standish Pulls it Off		Blackie and Son Ltd.	London and Glasgow	1940		
123	When the Allies Swept the Seas		Blackie and Son Ltd.	London and Glasgow	1940	J. C. B. Knight	Faded Page
124	The War – and Alan Carr		Blackie and Son Ltd.	London and Glasgow	1940	E. Boye Uden	
125	War Cargo		Blackie and Son Ltd.	London and Glasgow	1941		
126	Sea Scouts at Dunkirk		Blackie and Son Ltd.	London and Glasgow	1941		
127	Standish Holds On		Blackie and Son Ltd.	London and Glasgow	1941		
128	Fighting for Freedom		Blackie and Son Ltd.	London and Glasgow	1941		
129	Alan Carr in the Near East		Blackie and Son Ltd.	London and Glasgow	1942		
130	Destroyer's Luck		Blackie and Son Ltd.	London and Glasgow	1942		
131	Secret Flight		Blackie and Son Ltd.	London and Glasgow	1942		
132	On Guard for England		Blackie and Son Ltd.	London and Glasgow	1942	J. C. B. Knight	
133	A Real Boy's Book		Blackie and Son Ltd.	London and Glasgow	1942		(Note: with others)
134	With the Commandos		Blackie and Son Ltd.	London and Glasgow	1943	Salomon Van Abbé	
135	Sub-Lieutenant John Cloche		Blackie and Son Ltd.	London and Glasgow	1943	H. Pym	
136	Alan Carr in the Arctic		Blackie and Son Ltd.	London and Glasgow	1943	E. Boye Uden	
137	Combined Operations		Blackie and Son Ltd.	London and Glasgow	1944	Salomon Van Abbé	Faded Page
138	'Engage the Enemy Closely'		Blackie and Son Ltd.	London and Glasgow	1944	Terence T. Cuneo	
139	Secret Convoy		Blackie and Son Ltd.	London and Glasgow	1944	Terence T. Cuneo	
140	Alan Carr in Command		Blackie and Son Ltd.	London and Glasgow	1945	Terence T. Cuneo	
141	One of the Many		Blackie and Son Ltd.	London and Glasgow	1945	Ellis Silas	
142	'Operations Successfully Executed'		Blackie and Son Ltd.	London and Glasgow	1945	S. Drigin	
143	By Luck and by Pluck		Blackie and Son Ltd.	London and Glasgow	1946	Terence T. Cuneo	
144	Return to Base		Blackie and Son Ltd.	London and Glasgow	1946	Leslie A. Wilcox	
145	Squadron Leader		Blackie and Son Ltd.	London and Glasgow	1946	Terence T. Cuneo	
146	Unfettered Might		Blackie and Son Ltd.	London and Glasgow	1947	S. Jezzard	
147	Trapped in the Jungle		Blackie and Son Ltd.	London and Glasgow	1947	A. S. Forrest	
148	The Phantom Submarine		Blackie and Son Ltd.	London and Glasgow	1947	J. C. B. Knight	
149	The "Golden Gleaner"		Blackie and Son Ltd.	London and Glasgow	1948	M Mackinlay	
150	First Over		Blackie and Son Ltd.	London and Glasgow	1948	Ellis Silas	
151	The Mystery of the Key		Blackie and Son Ltd.	London and Glasgow	1948	Ellis Silas	
152	Missing, Believed Lost		Blackie and Son Ltd.	London and Glasgow	1949	Will Nickless	
153	Contraband		Blackie and Son Ltd.	London and Glasgow	1949	A. Barclay	
154	Beyond the Burma Road		Blackie and Son Ltd.	London and Glasgow	1949	Victor J. Bertoglio	
155	Sabarinda Island		Blackie and Son Ltd.	London and Glasgow	1950	A. Barclay	
156	The Mystery of Nix Hall		Blackie and Son Ltd.	London and Glasgow	1950	D. C. Eyles	
157	By Sea and Air	Midshipman Doughty and Forced Landing	Blackie and Son Ltd.	London and Glasgow	1950		
158	Desolation Island		Blackie and Son Ltd.	London and Glasgow	1950	W. Gale	
159	Held to Ransom		Blackie and Son Ltd.	London and Glasgow	1951	Ellis Silas	
160	The Isle of Mystery		Blackie and Son Ltd.	London and Glasgow	1951		
161	Working their Passage		Blackie and Son Ltd.	London and Glasgow	1951	Ellis Silas	
162	Sabotage!		Blackie and Son Ltd.	London and Glasgow	1952	Ellis Silas	
163	Round the World in the "Golden Gleaner"		Blackie and Son Ltd.	London and Glasgow	1952	Jack Matthew	Faded Page
164	Dangerous Cargo		Blackie and Son Ltd.	London and Glasgow	1952		
165	Bob Strickland's Log		Blackie and Son Ltd.	London and Glasgow	1953	Jack Matthew	
166	The Missing Diplomat		Blackie and Son Ltd.	London and Glasgow	1953	R. G. Campbell	
167	Rolling down to Rio''		Blackie and Son Ltd.	London and Glasgow	1953	R. G. Campbell	
168	Wrested from the Deep		Blackie and Son Ltd.	London and Glasgow	1954	Robert Johnston	
169	A Midshipman of the Fleet		Blackie and Son Ltd.	London and Glasgow	1954	P. A. Jobson	
170	The Ju–Ju Hand		Blackie and Son Ltd.	London and Glasgow	1954		
171	The "Dark Secret"		Blackie and Son Ltd.	London and Glasgow	1954	Victor J. Bertoglio	
172	'Sea Scouts Alert!'		Blackie and Son Ltd.	London and Glasgow	1955	G. Graham	
173	Daventry's Quest		Blackie and Son Ltd.	London and Glasgow	1955	P. A. Jobson	
174	The Lure of the Lagoon		Blackie and Son Ltd.	London and Glasgow	1955	E. Kearon	
175	Held in the Frozen North		Blackie and Son Ltd.	London and Glasgow	1956	Edward Osmond	
176	The Mystery of the Sempione		Blackie and Son Ltd.	London and Glasgow	1957	P.B. Batchelor	
177	Jack Craddock's Commission		Blackie and Son Ltd.	London and Glasgow	1958	Edward Osmond	
178	Mistaken Identity		Blackie and Son Ltd.	London and Glasgow	1959	Robert Johnston	

== Series ==
His publishing house S. W. Partridge included Westerman in a series entitled 'The Great Adventure Series' along with Rowland Walker, author of Oscar Danby, V.C.

== Example illustrations of Westerman's books ==
Westerman's books were illustrated, as was the norm with books intended for the juvenile market. Typically they had from four to six full-page illustration, although some had more. The Sea Monarch, which had originally been serialised in The Captain in 1911, had 12 full page illustrations. The Project Gutenberg edition of the book has eight more illustrations (not full pages size), as the book was scanned from Volume XXV of The Captain rather than from the book published by A. C. Black.

=== Illustrations for Westerman's first book ===
Illustrations by Edward S. Hodgson for A Lad of Grit: A Story of Adventure on Land and Sea in Restoration Times (1908). This was the first book by Westerman and the first of seventeen of his books to be illustrated by Hodgson. By courtesy of Project Gutenberg.

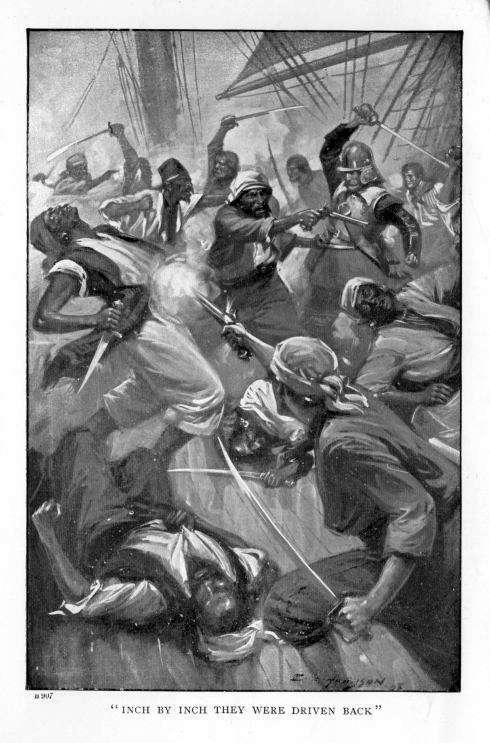
No.-1

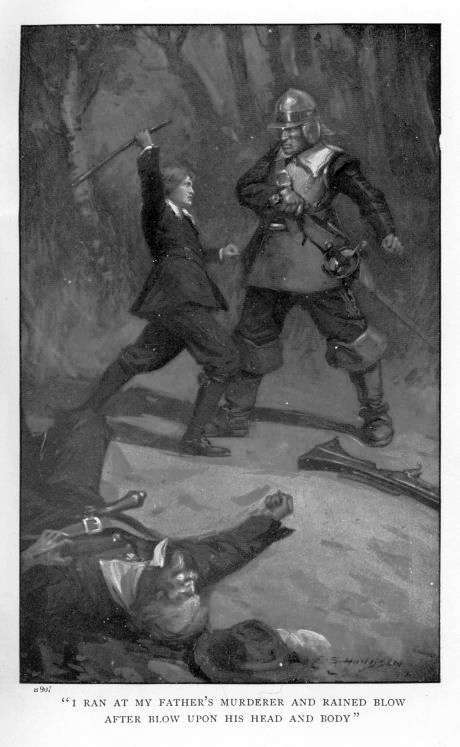
No.-2

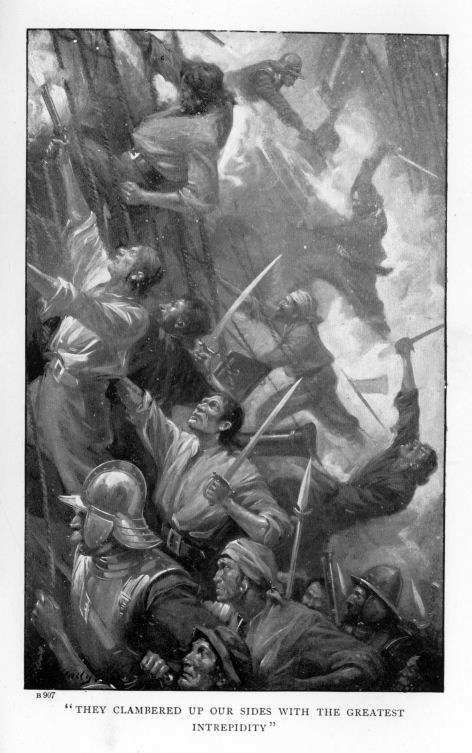
No.-3

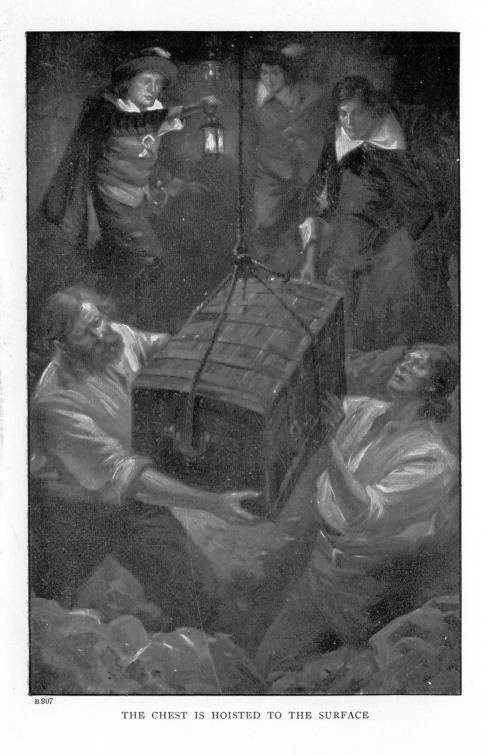
No.-4

=== Illustrations for one of Westerman's First World War stories ===
Illustrations by Edward S. Hodgson for Winning his Wings: A story of the R. A. F. (1920) by Westerman. This was another story by Westerman set in the First World War. It was one of seventeen books by Westerman illustrated by Hodgson. By courtesy of Project Gutenberg.

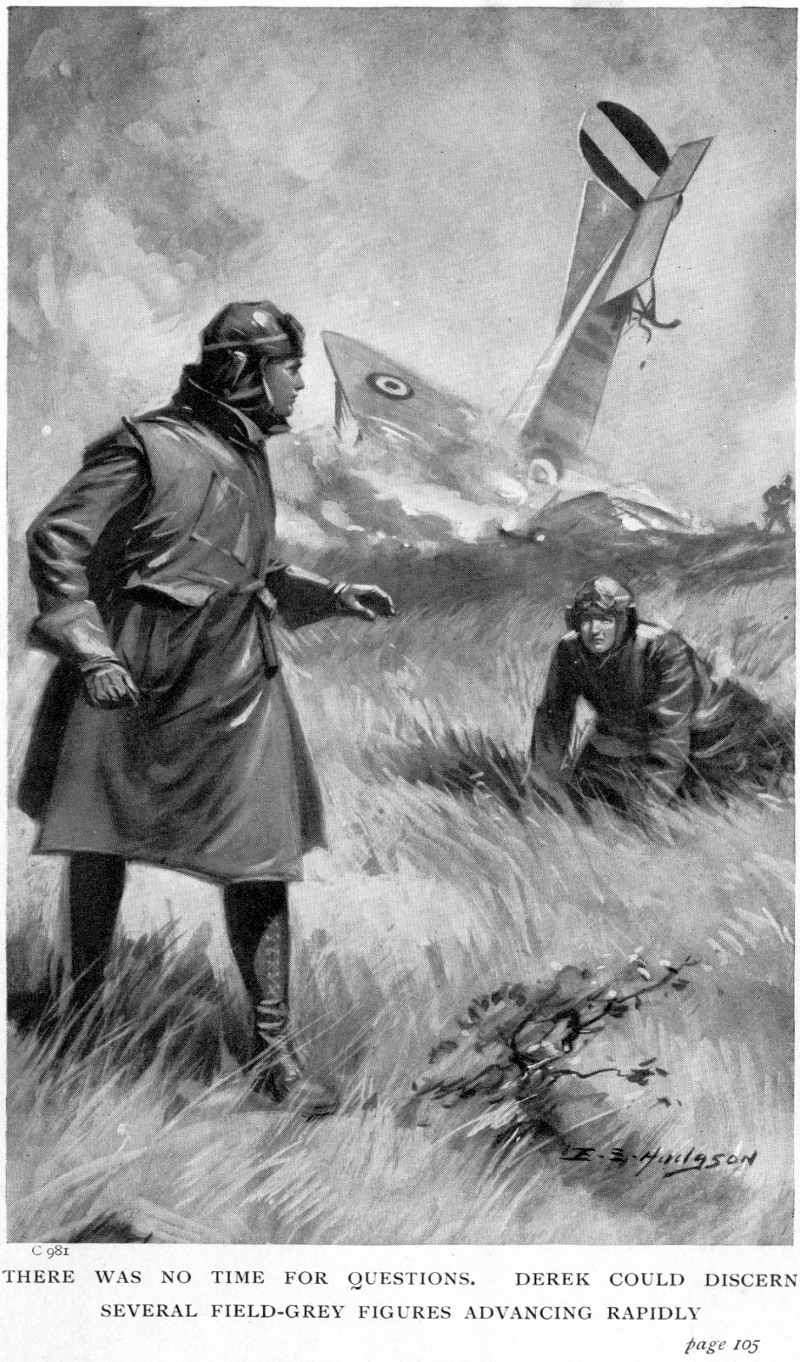
No.-1

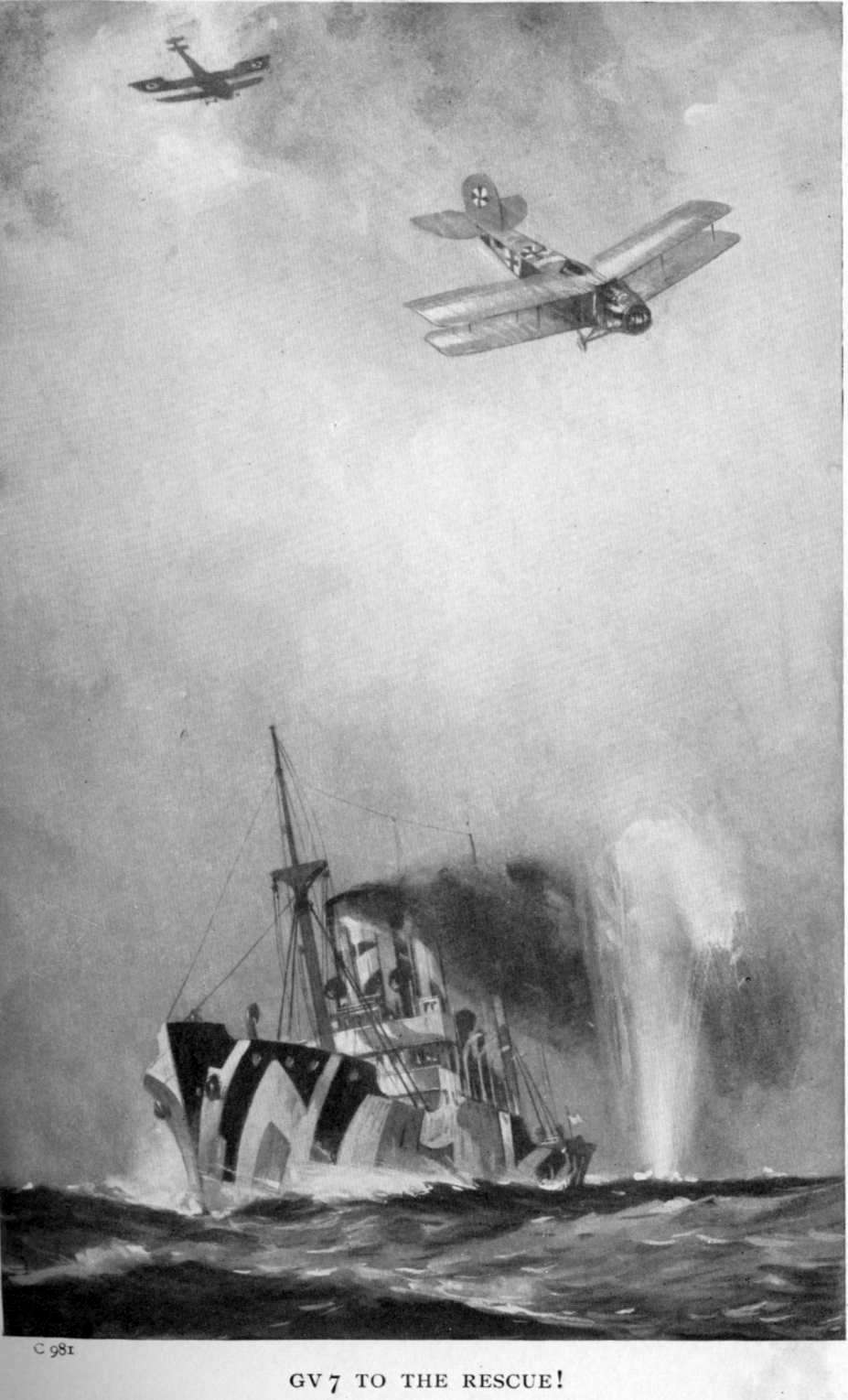
No.-2

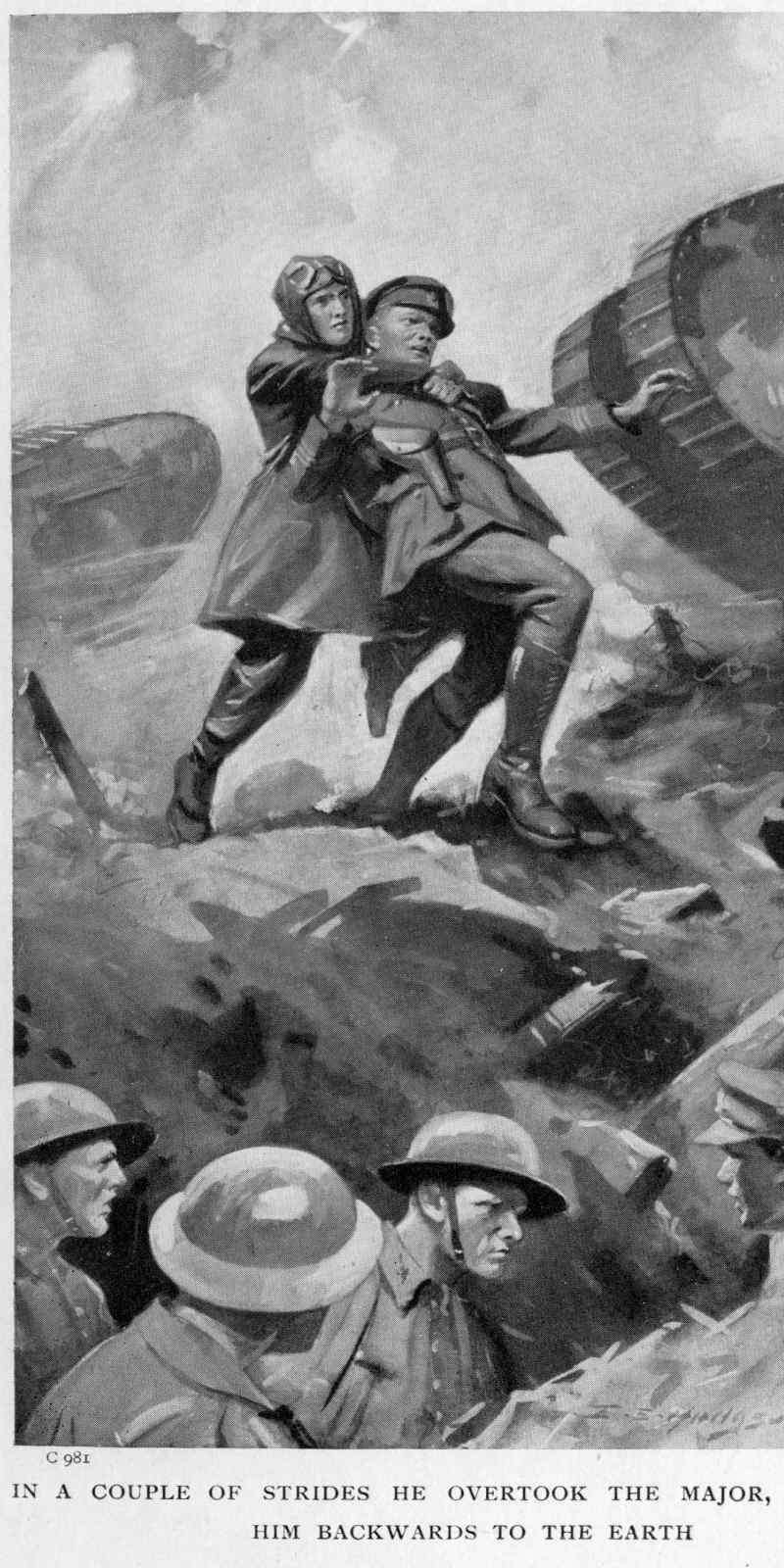
No.-3

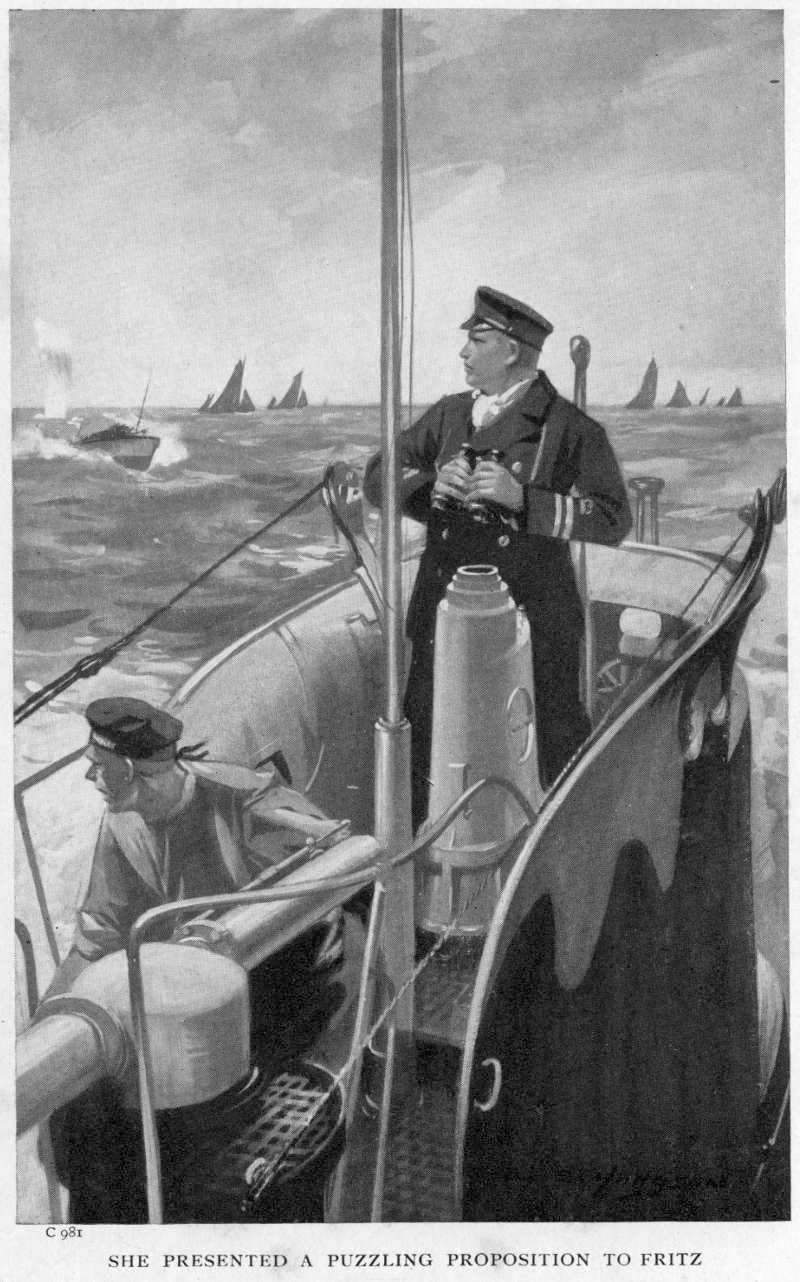
No.-4

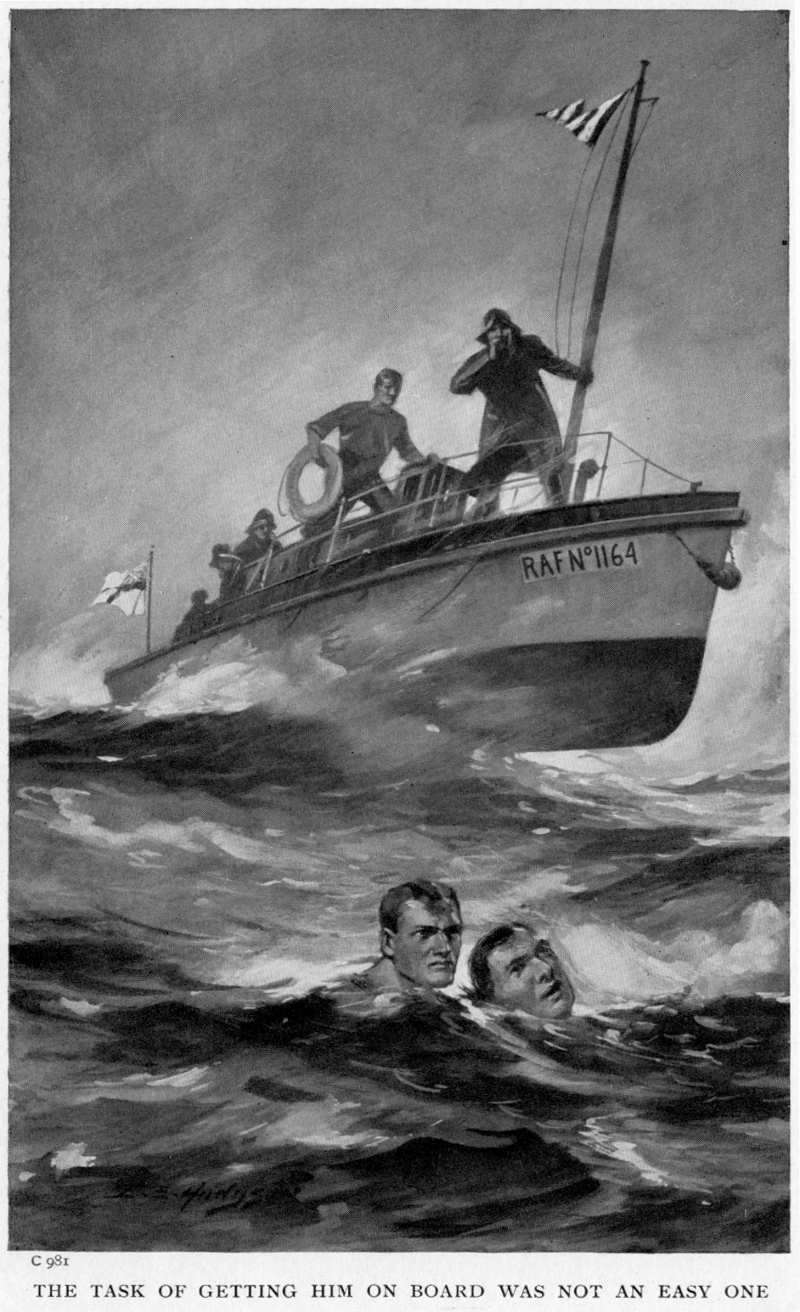
No.-5

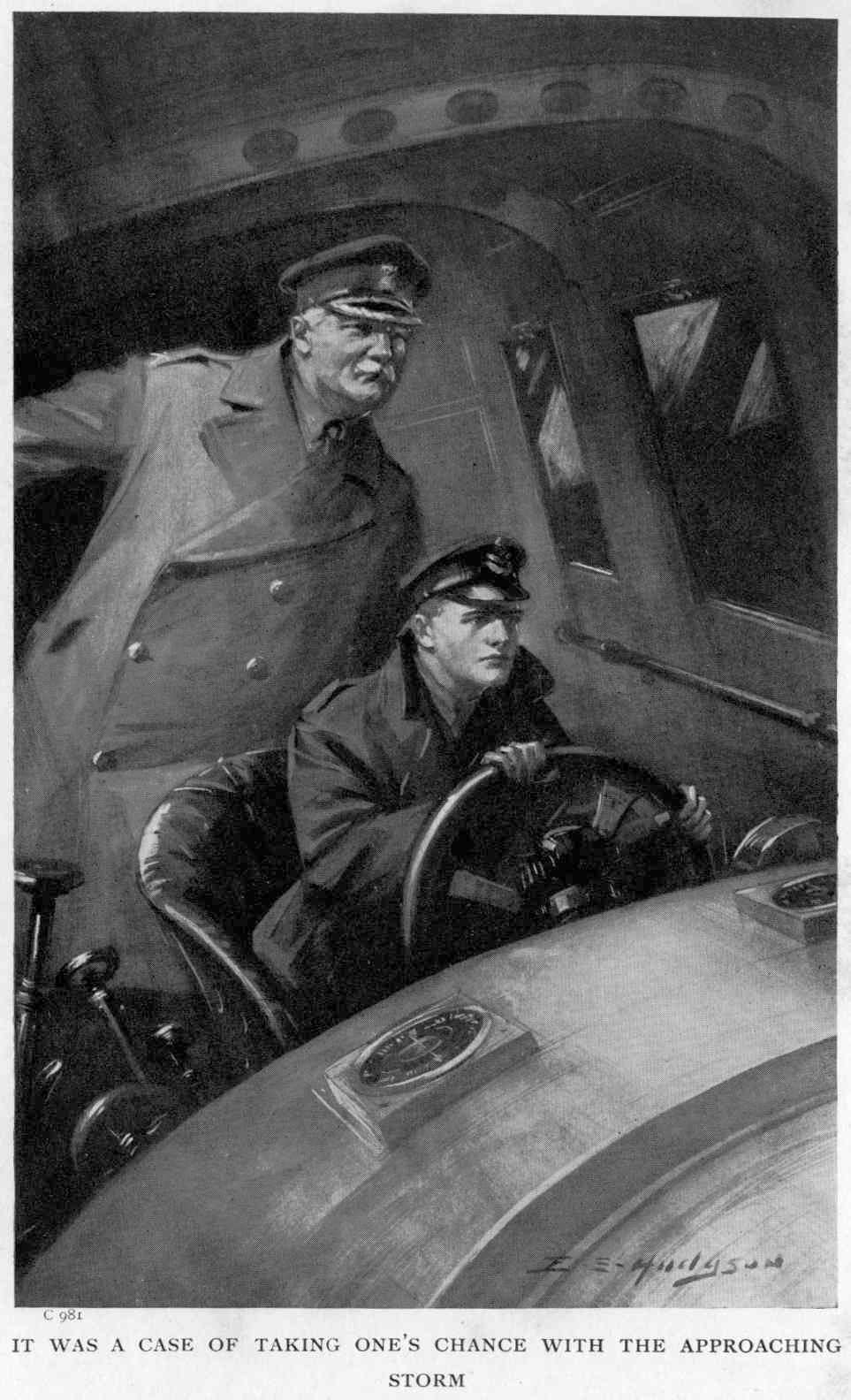
No.-6

== See also ==
- G. A. Henty
- W. E. Johns
- Herbert Strang

== Sources ==
- J.F.C. and Percy Westerman
- Obituary of Mr. Percy F. Westerman, The Times (London). 25 February 1959.
