= A Valley Grows Up =

1953 book by Edward Osmond

- Cover of first edition
- Author: Edward Osmond
- Illustrator: Osmond
- Cover artist: Osmond
- Subject: England from 5000 BCE to 1900
- Genre: Children's non-fiction, landscape history, cultural history
- Publisher: Oxford University Press
- Publication date: 1953
- Publication place: United Kingdom
- Media type: Print (hardcover)
- Pages: 81 pp. (first edition)
- OCLC: 4676338
- Dewey Decimal: 914.2
- LC Class: DA110 .O72

A Valley Grows Up is a history book for children, written and illustrated by Edward Osmond and published by Oxford University Press in 1953. It features an imaginary English valley over the course of seven thousand years, from 5000 BCE to 1900. Osmond won the annual Carnegie Medal, recognising the year's best children's book by a British subject. In more than seventy years only a handful of nonfiction books have been so honoured.

== Description ==
Ten full-colour double-page paintings and numerous black-and-white drawings combine with a simple, fluent text to tell the story of the changes in a valley's landscape and its gradual settlement from prehistoric to Victorian times. "[A]n uninhabited stretch of forest ... [becomes] a hillside, a swamp, a village and eventually the bustling Victorian town of Dungate." The same bend in the river, rounding a hill, appears throughout, as on the cover.

== Origins ==
Edward Osmond, a well known illustrator, was asked to help students with learning difficulties: "I illustrated on a blackboard my lectures by means of an imaginary village which, together, we created 'from scratch'." The educational effectiveness of the concept in seizing the imagination led to the idea for a picture book. The text was always secondary. Marcus Crouch describes the resulting book as "an imaginative interpretation of history".

== See also ==
- History of the British Isles
- History of England

Awards
Preceded by The Borrowers	Carnegie Medal recipient 1953	Succeeded by Knight Crusader
