= Edward Osmond =

English artist (1900–1981)

- Born: 6 May 1900 Orford, Suffolk, England
- Died: 1981 (aged 80–81) Lewes, England
- Education: Polytechnic-Regent Street (1917-24)
- Notable awards: Carnegie Medal (1954)
- Children: 1

Edward Osmond (6 May 1900 — 1981) was an English artist from the 1920s to 1960s. During this time period, Osmond primarily worked as an illustrator before publishing his first book for children, A Valley Grows Up, in 1953. The following year, Osmond received the 1954 Carnegie Medal for A Valley Grows Up. Osmond continued to write children's works during the 1950s to 1960s, including multiple series on animals. Apart from his children's works, Osmond's artworks were displayed at the Royal Academy of Arts and Royal Society of British Artists during the 1920s. He also was an art teacher at the Hastings College of Arts and Technology and Hornsey College of Art.

== Early life and education ==
On 6 May 1900 Osmond was born in Orford, Suffolk. For his post-secondary education, Osmond went to the Polytechnic-Regent Street for an art program between 1917 and 1924. At the end of his studies, Osmond received diplomas in painting and art history.

== Career ==
During the 1920s, Osmond had his art shown at the Royal Academy of Arts, Royal Society of British Artists and Walker Art Gallery. With his diplomas, Osmond taught art at the Hastings College of Arts and Technology and Hornsey College of Art. Osmond expanded his career into illustrations in 1928 before he wrote his first book for children, A Valley Grows Up, in 1953. As an illustrator from the 1950s to 1970s, Osmond primarily illustrated his own works. Authors that Osmond illustrated for during this period include Arthur Catherall, Percy Westerman, Cynthia Harnett and Richard Armstrong. During his writing career, Osmond received the Carnegie Medal in 1954 for A Valley Grows Up. Osmond continued to write throughout the 1950s and 1960s. Some of his works include a series about animals found throughout the world and another animal series focusing on Great Britain.

== Writing style and settings ==
While teaching his learning disability classes, Osmond "illustrated on a blackboard [his] lectures by means of an imaginary village". His school drawings became the basis for A Valley Grows Up. To create the fictional locations in A Valley Grows Up, Osmond used Lewes, Wye Valley and the shoreline of Dorset.

== Death and personal life ==
In 1981, Osmond died in Lewes. He was married and had one child.
