= Ronald Welch =

British children's writer (1909–1982)

Ronald Oliver Felton TD (14 December 1909 – 5 February 1982), who wrote under the pseudonym Ronald Welch, was a Welsh novelist. He is best known for children's historical fiction. He won the 1956 Carnegie Medal from the Library Association for the year's best children's book by a British author, for Knight Crusader, the first in his so-called Carey Family series of novels.

== Life ==
He was born in Aberavon, West Glamorgan, and educated at Berkhamsted School and Clare College, Cambridge, where he read history. He was teaching at Bedford Modern School when the Second World War broke out. In 1940 he was commissioned lieutenant in the Welch Regiment, to which his pen name refers. He reached the rank of major and stayed in the Territorial Army after the war. He was for many years headmaster of Okehampton Grammar School in Devon.

Welch's final work, The Road to Waterloo, not strictly speaking part of the Carey family saga but closely connected to it in terms of subject matter, remained unpublished at the time of his death. It was not until 2018 that it was discovered among his papers and published in a special edition by Smith Settle.

== Carey family saga ==
=== Books ===
Carey Family Books
Reading order	Pub. Date	Book	Main Characters	Other characters	Setting
1	1954	Knight Crusader (Note: Miscellany Five, edited by Edward Blishen (Oxford, 1968), includes a Ronald Welch short story "The Joust", which has as one of its characters Philip d'Aubigny the Crusader, hero of Knight Crusader. The hero, Owen, comes to the favourable attention of Sir Philip and becomes his squire.)	Phillip d'Aubigny	Hugo d'Aubigny (father, killed 1187, Battle of Hattin), Gilbert d'Assailly	1186 – 1192? Third Crusade
2	1966	Bowman of Crécy (Note: Bowman of Crécy and The Galleon include but do not feature members of the Carey family.)	Hugh Fletcher	Sir John Carey (not listed in family trees), William Assailly	1343? – 1346 Edward III / Hundred Years War / Crecy
3	1967	The Hawk	Harry Carey (later 2nd Earl)	Edward Carey (1st Earl, father), James Carey (uncle), Mary Carey (sister), Margaret Carey (sister)	1584 – 1586 Elizabeth I
4	1971	The Galleon	Robert Penderyn	Edward Carey (1st Earl of Aubigny), Harry Carey	1583–1586? Elizabeth I
5	1961	For the King (Note: The 1970 short story entitled "The King's Hunt" is set at the 17th century English Civil War battle of Edgehill and Neil Carey appears in it, so it aligns with For the King. (Neil Carey does not appear in a 1963 story with the same title, published in the British children's comic Swift.))	Neil Carey (later 4th Earl)	Edward Carey (3rd Earl, father), Denzil Carey (brother, killed 1644, Marston Moor)	1642 – 1648 English Civil War / Royalists
6	1956	Captain of Dragoons	Charles Carey (later 6th Earl)	John Carey (cousin, killed 1704), Vicomte d'Assailly	1703 – 1704 Duke of Marlborough / Battle of Blenheim
7	1958	Mohawk Valley	Alan Carey	Charles Carey (6th Earl, father), Anne Carey (sister)	1755 – 1759 French and Indian War / General Wolfe / Quebec / Seven Years' War
8	1960	Escape From France (Note: Extract appears in "A Date With Danger" (Octopus Books, 1984). Published for Marks and Spencer, a large British retail chain.)	Richard Carey (later 8th Earl)	George Carey (7th Earl, father), Anne Standish (Carey) (aunt), Jeffery Standish (cousin, killed 1794), Rupert Carey (uncle), Christopher Carey (cousin), Peter Carey (cousin) Quentin d'Assailly, Amelie d'Assailly, Armand d'Assailly, Louise d'Assailly (later Lady Aubigny)	1791 – 1794 Revolutionary France
9	1959	Captain of Foot	Christopher Carey	Richard Carey (8th Earl, cousin), Peter Carey (brother), Anne Standish (Carey) (aunt) Louise Aubigny (d'Assailly)	1808 – 1812 Duke of Wellington / Peninsular War
10	2018	The Road to Waterloo	James Carey (later 9th Earl)	Richard Carey (8th Earl, father)	1815 Battle of Quatre Bras
11	1963	Nicholas Carey	Nicholas Carey	James Carey (9th Earl, cousin), Robert Carey (cousin), Bernard Carey (later 10th Earl, cousin), Andrew Carey (cousin), John Carey (brother), Felix d'Assailly, Louise Aubigny (d'Assailly)	1853 – 1855 Italian nationalism / Crimean War
12	1976	Ensign Carey	William Carey (killed 1857, Nasirabad, Indian Mutiny)	John Carey (father), Nicholas Carey (uncle), Edward Carey (brother)	1853 – 1857 Indian Mutiny / Bengal Presidency
13	1972	Tank Commander	John Carey	Peter Carey (father)	1914 – 1917 World War I / The Great War

=== Family members ===
Carey Family Members
Name	Born	Died	Books	Military service
Alan	1735	1770	Mohawk Valley
Andrew		1905	Nicholas Carey
Anne	1739	1814	Mohawk Valley, Escape from France, Captain of Foot
Bernard (10th Earl)		1902	Nicholas Carey	Captain, Dragoons or Dragoon Guards
Charles (6th Earl)	1681	1767	Captain of Dragoons, Mohawk Valley	Major, Cadogan's Dragoons
Charles (11th Earl)		1936
Christopher	1788	1812	Captain of Foot	Captain, 43rd Light Infantry
Denzil		1644	For the King
Edward (1st Earl)		1594	The Hawk, The Galleon
Edward (3rd Earl)		1655	For the King
Edward		1911	Ensign Carey	Captain, Royal Navy
George (7th Earl)	1734	1800	Escape from France
Harry (2nd Earl)		1630	The Hawk, The Galleon
Henry	1775	1853
James			The Hawk
James (5th Earl)		1704
James (9th Earl)	1796/1798?	1868	Nicholas Carey, The Road to Waterloo	Cornet, 30th Light Dragoons
John		1704	Captain of Dragoons
John		1885	Nicholas Carey, Ensign Carey	Admiral, Royal Navy
John		Alive in 1976	Tank Commander	General, West Glamorgan Regiment (fictional, ex-110th Foot), Tank Corps
Lawrence		1693
Margaret			The Hawk
Mary			The Hawk
Mary		1937
Matthew		1590
Neil (4th Earl)	1632	1690	For the King
Nicholas		1910	Nicholas Carey, Ensign Carey	Colonel, 110th Foot (fictional)
Oliver		1798
Peter	1780	1850	Captain of Foot
Peter		1940	Tank Commander	Admiral, Royal Navy
Richard (8th Earl)	1770	1839	Escape from France, Captain of Foot, The Road to Waterloo	Lieutenant-Colonel, 3rd Dragoon Guards
Robert		1870	Nicholas Carey
Rupert	1737	1807	Escape from France
William		1692
William		1857	Ensign Carey	Ensign, 84th Bengal Native Infantry (fictional)

== Works ==
=== Books ===
- The Black Car Mystery (1950)
- The Clock Stood Still (1951)
- The Gauntlet (1951)
- Knight Crusader^{†} (1954) —winner of the Carnegie Medal
- Sker House (novel) (1955) (writing as Ronald Felton) (based on Sker House)
- Ferdinand Magellan (1955)
- Captain of Dragoons^{†} (1956)
- "The Long Bow" (1957, booklet consisting of the abridged first three chapters of Bowman of Crécy)
- Mohawk Valley^{†} (1958)
- Captain of Foot^{†} (1959)
- Escape from France^{†} (1960)
- For the King^{†} (1961)
- Nicholas Carey^{†} (1963)
- Bowman of Crécy^{†} (1966)
- The Hawk^{†} (1967)
- Sun of York (1970)
- The Galleon^{†} (1971)
- Tank Commander^{†} (1972)
- Zulu Warrior (1974)
- Ensign Carey^{†} (1976)
- The Road to Waterloo^{†} (2018) (posthumous)

† indicates a book in the Carey family series

=== Short stories ===
- "The Kings Hunt" (1963), Swift Annual 1963
- "The Joust" (1968), Miscellany Five, edited by Edward Blishen
- "The King's Hunt" (1970), Thrilling Stories of the Past for Boys, edited by Eric Duthie

== Critical reception ==
Pamela Cleaver describes Ronald Welch as the best children's writer on military history and battles, adding that he does not glorify war but makes it clear that discomfort, wounds and death are as much a part of it as comradeship and adventure. She characterizes his books as "extremely well-researched, full of authentic detail and always excitingly plotted".
