= King of Kilba =

1926 children's adventure novel by Percy F. Westerman

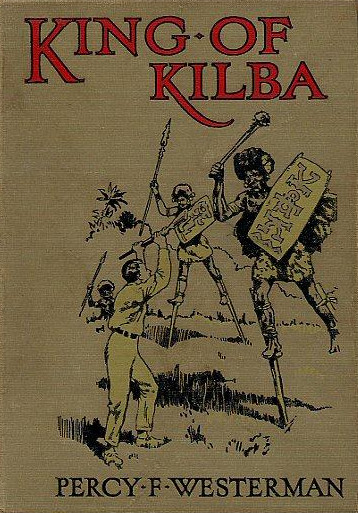
- First edition
- Author: Percy F. Westerman
- Language: English
- Genre: Children's literature
- Publisher: Ward, Lock & Co.
- Publication date: 1926
- Publication place: United Kingdom
- Media type: Print (Hardcover and Paperback)

King of Kilba is a 1926 children's adventure novel by Percy F. Westerman. It follows Kenneth Kilsyth, a young clerk in London, and his friend Gerald Hayes, as they embark on a series of adventures at sea, and on the island of Kilba.

== Plot summary ==
Kenneth Kilsyth, a young clerk in a London counting house, and a most reluctant employee, wins £1000 in a football pool (nearly £200,000 at present-day prices calculated as average earnings, or over £43,000 calculated as retail price index).

Inviting his sole friend and fellow clerk, Gerald Hayes, to join him, he embarks on a journey of adventure.

Some time later, they find themselves the sole passengers on a merchant ship, the S.S. Mumtaz, steaming from Vancouver to Honolulu, but all the officers and most of the sailors are quickly wiped out by a mysterious disease, leaving the two passengers the only people alive. Bridges, the quartermaster of the crew, survives long enough to help dispose of the bodies overboard and shows the lads how to rig a sail on to the wallowing freighter. Under the influence of the North-East trade winds and the North Equatorial current, the Mumtaz eventually drifts over a coral reef and lodges on the leeward side.

The boys are near an island, and arming themselves with guns from the captain’s cabin, they land on the island. At dawn, atop a small hill, they are confronted by an army of 'savages'. But the natives attack on stilts (the ground is taboo to them) and the boys are able to defend themselves. The attack is suddenly called off by an elderly white man who speaks broken English. He reveals that he was shipwrecked many years before and has become 'King' of the island, called Kilba. This is in accordance with a local prophecy that a white man will always rule the people. From him, they learn that tribal warfare between the two islands of Kilba and Neka has existed for many generations.

They take part in some battles, and eventually the old king dies. Kilsyth is forced to accept the title, with 'Haya', as Hayes is now known, as his 'brother'. They conduct the continuing war against the neighboring island. They attempt to introduce the islanders to football and cricket. Cricket proves so attractive that the natives relax their vigilance. The Nekas invade and carry off Hayes as a captive. He is lowered into an abyss as a sacrifice to an enormous crab, known as 'Bonga Te Akka' (the great mill wheel).

The crab, with a shell six feet across and claws over eight feet long, is about to devour its prey when Kilsyth and an army of Kilbans arrive to rescue him. But the tables are turned and Kilsyth is himself sacrificed to the crab. His small gun is useless, but he manages to light a fire, which deflects and then burns the crab to death. The Nekans attempt to kill Kilsyth anyway, but are thwarted when the two heroes are rescued by a party of New Zealanders prospecting for ambergris. In fact, one of the island's sheltered bays contains vast stores of this valuable material. The two men promise to reveal the location of the cache, in return for equal partnerships in the firm of Wilcox and Co in Auckland, who are sponsoring the search.

They fly away in the explorer's aeroplane, thus fulfilling another island prophecy that the King will be taken away by a 'great bird' when his work is done.
