= Knight Crusader =

1954 book by Ronald Welch

- Cover of first edition
- Author: Ronald Welch
- Illustrator: William Stobbs
- Language: English
- Series: Carey family
- Subject: Crusader states, Third Crusade, Anglo-Norman England
- Genre: Children's historical novel
- Publisher: Oxford University Press
- Publication date: 1954
- Publication place: United Kingdom
- Media type: Print (hardcover)
- Pages: 272 pp (first edition)
- ISBN: 0192770861 (1979)
- OCLC: 315242056
- LC Class: PZ7.W4489 Kn

Knight Crusader, "the story of Philip d'Aubigny", is a children's historical novel by Ronald Welch (Ronald Oliver Fenton), first published by Oxford in 1954 with illustrations by William Stobbs. It is set primarily in the Crusader states of Outremer in the twelfth century and features the Battle of Hattin and the Third Crusade. Welch won the annual Carnegie Medal from the Library Association, recognising the year's best children's book by a British subject.

== Plot summary ==
The novel is divided into three parts: the first part leads up to the Battle of Hattin; the second part, set four years later, shows Philip d'Aubigny's escape from captivity at the time of the Third Crusade, and the final part deals with Philip's reclaiming his ancestral lands in the Welsh Marches.

At the beginning of the novel, Outremer has been in existence for nearly one hundred years since the capture of Jerusalem in 1099. However, the Emir Saladin is uniting the Islamic forces against the Crusader states. The great military orders of the Knights Templar and Knights Hospitaller are eager for the fray, but others are concerned that there are not enough Christian knights in Outremer to form an effective field army while continuing to garrison the castles that protect the Latin Kingdom. Saladin invades Outremer and besieges Tiberias. Guy of Lusignan, the charming but weak-willed King of Jerusalem, is swayed by poor advice to march the assembled forces of Outremer to the relief of the city across a waterless plain at the height of summer. Debilitated by the desert conditions before the battle even begins, the Christian army suffers a devastating defeat at Hattin. Most of the weakly-held fortresses of Outremer fall to Saladin and Jerusalem is taken by the Muslim armies.

These events are shown through the experiences of Philip d'Aubigny. Philip is a young nobleman who was born in Outremer, descendant of a Norman knight who rode with the First Crusade. Philip's father is a Baron of the High Court of Jerusalem and lord of the castle of Blanch Garde. Philip befriends a Turk, Jusuf, whom he rescues from robbers, and later impresses the king by his superior swordsmanship in a duel, gaining his knighthood. Philip overhears much discussion about the complex political and military situation. He suffers on the desert march, sees his father die in battle and is taken prisoner.

Philip has a relatively easy captivity in the household of Jusuf's father Usamah in Damascus, but chafes to be free. With the Hospitallers help he and his friend Gilbert escape over the walls. They make their way to Krak, the great Hospitaller fortress, after an encounter with the Assassins. Philip commits himself to the service of Richard of England and during the campaigns of the Third Crusade becomes one of the most celebrated knights of Christendom.

In the final chapters of the novel, Philip and his company of Crusaders arrive in Britain, where he takes part in a jousting tournament at Cardiff Castle. He learns from his squire's father that his family's castle at Llanstephan has been taken by an ally of Prince John's and leads a raiding party to win it back.

A notable aspect of the book is the bringing into contrast of the refinements of the medieval Islamic civilisation, which had been adopted by the Outremer noblemen, with the comparatively stark and crude European living conditions of the time, and the suggestion that the returning Crusaders brought Eastern standards of luxury and culture to the West.

== Characters ==
- Philip d'Aubigny of Blanche Garde, a squire, later knight, of Outremer
- Sir Hugo d'Aubigny of Blanche Garde, a Baron of the High Court of the Kingdom of Jerusalem, Philip's father
- Llewellyn, Philip's manservant
- Sir Fulk de Grandmesnil, Philip's uncle
- Sir Joscelin de Grandmesnil, Philip's cousin
- Sir Walter de Nogent, a newcomer to Outremer, who challenges Philip to a duel
- Sir Gilbert d'Assailly, Philip's friend, a young knight from Normandy
- Jusuf Al-Hafiz, a Muslim nobleman
- Peter de Chaworth, a young squire, taken on by Philip in Part Two
- Sir Geoffrey de Chaworth of Kidwelly Castle, Peter's father
- Richard de Clare, son of the Earl of Gloucester, Philip's page in Part Three
- Sir Walter de Braose, a cousin of the d'Aubignys who holds Llanstephan

=== Historical characters ===
- Guy of Lusignan, King of Jerusalem
- Sir Balian d'Ibelin, a Baron of the High Court of the Kingdom of Jerusalem, here Philip's godfather
- Raynald of Châtillon, Lord of Oultrejordain
- Raymond of Tripoli
- Saladin, leader of the Saracens
- Usamah Ibn-Menquidh, a diplomat and scholar of Damascus, here Jusuf's father
- The Old Man of the Mountains, leader of the Assassins
- King Richard of England, a leader of the Third Crusade
- Conrad of Montferrat, a contender for the kingship of Jerusalem
- Roger de Moulins, Grand Master of the Knights Hospitaller

== Literary significance and reception ==
Knight Crusader is the author's first fully historical novel. (The Gauntlet, three years earlier, was a time slip story set partly in the Middle Ages.) It is generally considered the first of his Carey series; although the surname does not appear in this novel, the Careys were Earls of Aubigny. The novel was awarded the Carnegie Medal as the most outstanding children's book of 1954.

In The Nesbit Tradition, Marcus Crouch describes Knight Crusader as Welch's finest book: "a highly competent piece of writing, the historical detail tightly integrated with the subject matter, the narrative economical and very brisk. The battle scenes are magnificently done". However, he criticises its lack of selectivity: "Welch was so keen to put all he knew and felt about the Crusades into his book that he dissipated his effects and left a string of loose ends."

In an essay on historical fiction about the Crusades, Robert Irwin discussed Knight Crusader. Irwin stated that "Welch's novel is attractively written", and notes that "it argues the case for coexistence with the enemy."

== See also ==
- Philip d'Aubigny

Awards
Preceded by A Valley Grows Up	Carnegie Medal recipient 1954	Succeeded by The Little Bookroom
