= Rainwater harvesting in the United Kingdom =

Rainwater harvesting in the United Kingdom is a practice of growing importance. Rainwater harvesting in the UK is both a traditional and a reviving technique for collecting water for domestic uses. The water is generally used for non-hygienic purposes like watering gardens, flushing toilets, and washing clothes. In commercial premises like supermarkets it is used for things like toilet flushing where larger tank systems can be used collecting between 1000 and 7500 litres of water. It is claimed that in the South East of England there is less water available per person than in many Mediterranean countries.

Rainwater is almost always collected strictly from the roof, then heavily filtered using either a filter attached to the down pipe, a fine basket filter or for more expensive systems like self-cleaning filters placed in an underground tank. UK homes using some form of rainwater harvesting system can reduce their mains water usage by 50% or more, although a 20%–30% saving is more common. At present (depending on the area in the UK) mains water delivery and equivalent waste water and sewerage processing costs about £2 per cubic metre. Reducing mains-water metered volumes also reduces the sewerage and sewage disposal costs in the same proportion, because water company billing assumes that all water taken into the house is discharged into the sewers.

== Current status ==
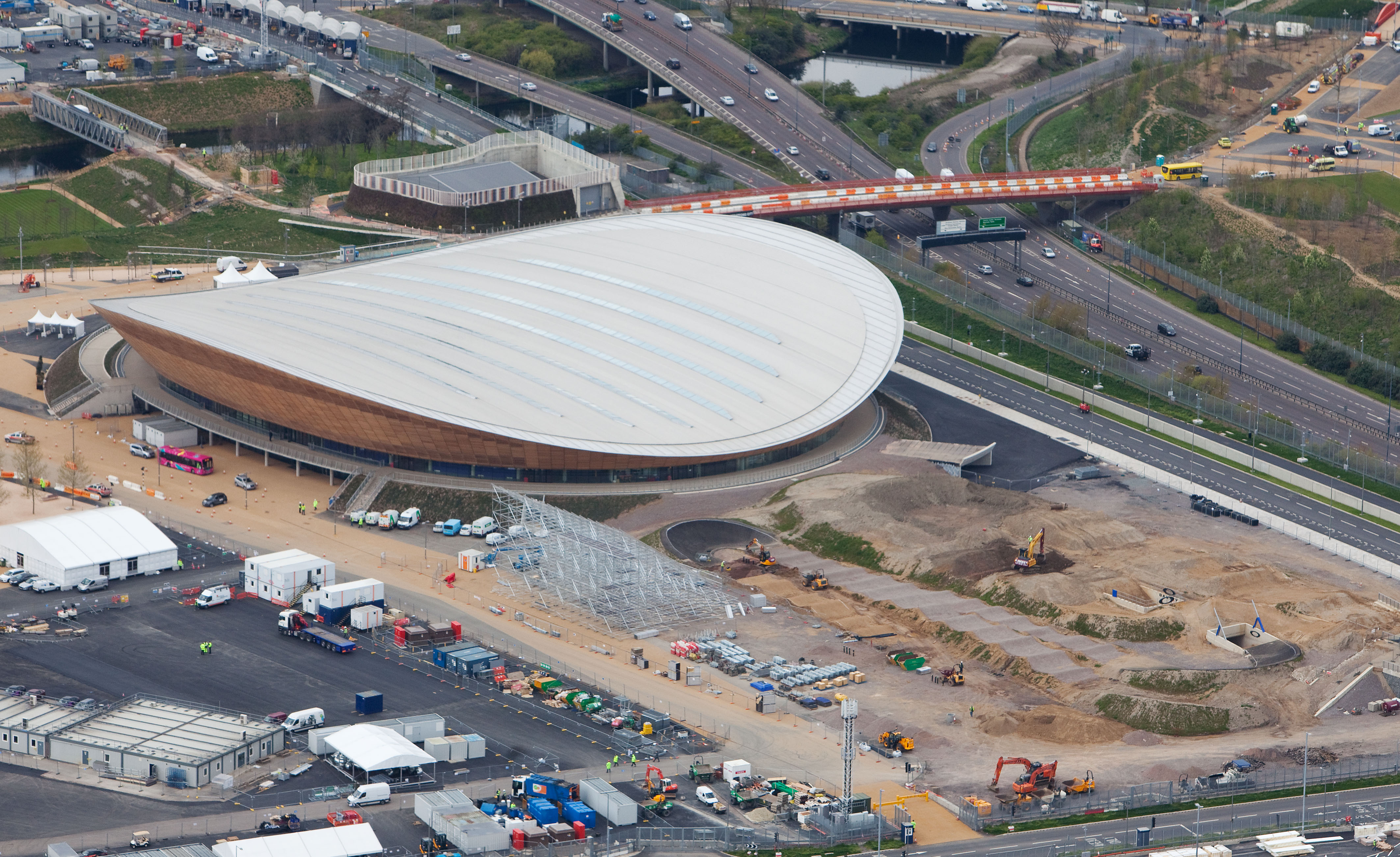
The velodrome of the London Olympic Park is designed to harvest rainwater.

In recent years, rainwater harvesting has become more common due to increasing water prices. While rainwater harvesting has been employed in high-profile facilities like the velodrome of the London Olympic Park, the UK's ongoing revival has lagged behind other countries such as Germany (the present world leader in modern rainwater harvesting). At present, only about 400 RWH systems are installed in the UK every year.

Some large retail developments are now incorporating rainwater harvesting even in some of the wetter parts of the UK.

Rainwater harvesting was encouraged by the UK government through the Code for Sustainable Homes. The code ranked homes on a scale of one to six, and required new homes to have a score of at least three. One way to raise the score of a newly-designed home was to incorporate a rainwater harvesting system. The code was revoked in 2015.

In the United Kingdom, water butts are often found in domestic gardens and on allotments to collect rainwater, which is then used to water the garden. However, the British government's Code for Sustainable Homes encouraged fitting large underground tanks to newly built homes to collect rainwater for flushing toilets, watering, and washing. Ideal designs had the potential to reduce demand on mains water supply by half.

The Environment Agency has noted that water resources in the UK are under increasing pressure because of the growing population. In addition, the agency has warned that the South East of England is facing more serious water scarcity than anywhere else in England or Wales, such that the per-capita water supply is lower than many Mediterranean countries. The agency encourages a two-pronged approach to both reduce demand and increase supply, such as through the use of rainwater harvesting. However, there is a fundamental mismatch between supply and demand; the areas of the UK suffering water scarcity are in most cases also areas with low rainfall, which means the economics of installing a domestic RWH system are less favourable. The environmental impacts of domestic RWH systems in energy terms are questioned since the water supply accounts for a very small proportion of total energy use (approximately 4%). For a UK household, the CO_{2} impact of supplying water to the house is around 100g of CO_{2} per day, around 1/600th of its total daily impact. However, in countries without widespread mains water supplies, or where the environmental impact of mains water is very high, RWH may have more merit.

The installation of rainwater harvesting systems in the UK should be done according to the Water Supply (Water Fittings) Regulations and BS EN 16941-1:2018 in order to ensure safety. BS EN 16941-1:2018 also provides details on how to size the storage tank for water supply and allows estimation of the potential water savings. In addition The SuDS Manual also offers guidance on designing systems for stormwater management. Anyone installing a RWH system needs to inform their water supplier.

Rainwater harvesting at large scale may well be appropriate for farms as part of a catchment management strategy to decrease flood risk and diffuse pollution.

== History ==
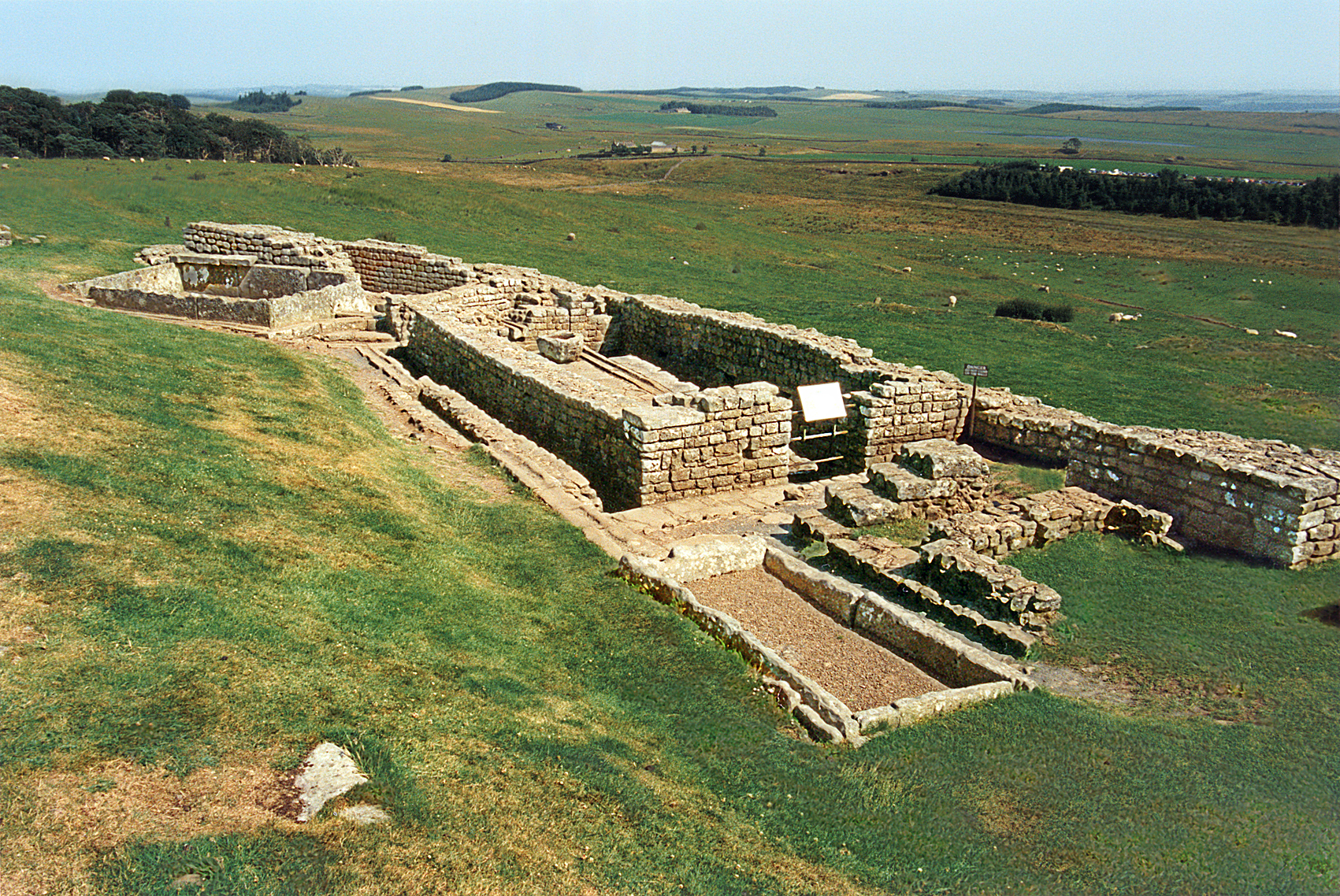
Center – Latrines of Housesteads Roman Fort; Top left – Rainwater collection tank

Before the widespread use of water mains, RWH was a traditional means of obtaining water in the UK. Even as far back as the 2nd century AD, archaeological evidence shows that rainwater harvesting was being used at Housesteads Roman Fort in Northumberland to flush the latrines. English castles from the 12th and 13th centuries also have notable rainwater harvesting systems, such as Carreg Cennen, Orford, and Warkworth Castle.

In the 19th and early 20th centuries, before widespread access to water mains, most large middle-class homes got their drinking water from springs and wells, but this water was usually hard which made it unsuitable for washing. Thus, such homes were usually designed to harvest rainwater to be used for washing. During the interwar period, houses in hard water areas were sometimes built with rainwater storage tanks forming the roof of a scullery. Rainwater was led down to a third tap for washing purposes. Rainwater harvesting declined in popularity as water mains became more widespread from the early 20th century onwards.

A select committee of MPs recommended in 2012 that the government should "take more active steps to promote rainwater harvesting and water recycling and seek to incorporate incentives or requirements for their inclusion in the design of new developments".

== See also ==
- Climate of the United Kingdom
- Drought in the United Kingdom
- Air well (condenser)
