= John F. C. Westerman =

English author (1901–1991)

John Francis Cyril Westerman (born at Southsea, Hampshire 22 January 1901, died at La Linea, Spain 21 November 1991) was an English author of children's literature. He was the son of author Percy F. Westerman, and wrote at least thirty full length stories for boys, mostly about flying but some in a school series, and edited works for Oxford University Press. His most famous character was John Wentley, the intrepid airman and adventurer.

In December 1928, he was married to Muriel Poulter after her separation from her husband C N Lindsaye by whom she had two children, Hugh and Jennie. J F C Westerman "adopted" the children although they retained the surname of Lindsaye. He rose to the rank of major in the British army serving with the King's African Rifles and in Korea. Late in life around 1977 he was known to have lived on a yacht both in Gibraltar harbour and off the coast of Gibraltar with his second wife Margaret, an Irish career nursing sister. They later moved to a static caravan home along the Costa del Sol.

Selected Works

Novels

The Counter-Stroke (Ward, Lock & Co., 1946)

John Wentley Investigates (Collins 1951)

The Secret Island

The Looted Gold (Ward, Lock & Co, 1932)

John Wentley Wins Through (Children's Press)

Twelve Months To Win
