= Matilda de Braose (Deheubarth) =

Welsh noblewoman (fl. 1240s)

Matilda de Braose was the 2nd wife of Rhys Mechyll, son of Rhys Gryg and grandson of the Lord Rhys, Prince of Deheubarth.

Matilda's parents were Reginald de Braose, Lord of Brecon and Abergavenny, and his wife Gwladus (Also known as "Gwladus the Dark Eye") Ddu (Daughter of Gwladus Ferch Llywelyn) (c.1189-1251)

Rhys Mechyll died in 1244 and some time after this Matilda placed the castle of Carreg Cennen in the hands of the Normans.

A Welsh chronicle, the Brut y Tywysogyon, records under the year 1248: "Rhys Fychan ap Rhys Mechyll regained the castle of Carreg Cennen, which his mother had treacherously placed in the power of the French, out of enmity for her son."
