= The Gauntlet (novel) =

1951 novel by Ronald Welch

First edition (publ. Oxford University Press)

The Gauntlet is a children's historical novel, written by Ronald Welch, and published in 1951. It is a time slip story set both in 1951 (the present day) and in 1326, mainly in Carreg Cennen Castle, but also in Kidwelly Castle and Valle Crucis Abbey.

== Plot ==
The story begins with Peter Staunton and his friend Gwyn Evans finding a rusted iron gauntlet while on holiday in the Brecon Beacons. When Peter puts the gauntlet on, he hears medieval sounds such as "the thud of hooves", and hears that there have been others who had similar experiences.

Peter then spends time learning about medieval life in Wales and neighbouring England and, after falling asleep in the garden of Carreg Cennen Castle, finds himself back in medieval times. He has a number of experiences, such as attending a medieval banquet, visiting the abbey, watching a joust, before returning to fight in a siege of the castle by the Welsh, where he is hit and falls unconscious. While in 1326, he buries his misericorde in the herb garden.

He wakes back in his own time, and tries to convince his friends there that he was not simply dreaming. He remembers that he had buried his dagger, and eventually unearths a corroded knife, but it is not clear if this was the one he buried.

== Historical notes ==
The names of the Marcher lords given are historical, and the descriptions of the castles and abbey are accurate, but the location of Valle Crucis was moved from North Wales to South Wales.

== Reception ==
The book was included in the journal Elementary English listing of Best Children's Books of 1952.
