= Collingwood =

Collingwood, meaning "wood of disputed ownership", may refer to:

== Educational institutions ==
- Collingwood College, Victoria, an Australian state Prep to Year 12 school
- Collingwood College, Durham, college of Durham University, England
- Collingwood College, Surrey, state secondary comprehensive technology college in Camberley, England
- Collingwood School, university-preparatory school in West Vancouver, British Columbia, Canada

== Places ==
=== Australia ===
- Collingwood, Queensland, a ghost town west of Winton on the Western River
- Collingwood, Victoria, an inner suburb of Melbourne
  - Collingwood railway station
- City of Collingwood, a former local government area in Victoria, Australia
- Collingwood, Liverpool, a museum in Sydney

=== Canada ===
- Collingwood, Calgary, a neighbourhood in Calgary, Alberta
- Collingwood, Vancouver, a neighbourhood in southeast Vancouver, British Columbia
- Collingwood, Nova Scotia
- Collingwood, Ontario

=== New Zealand ===
- Collingwood, New Zealand
  - Collingwood (New Zealand electorate)

== Ships ==
- HMS Collingwood, a list of ships that have used the name within the Royal Navy
- HMCS Collingwood, a Flower-class corvette that served with the Royal Canadian Navy launched in 1940

== Sports teams ==
- Collingwood Football Club, of the Australian Football League
- Collingwood Magpies Netball, of the National Netball League
- Collingwood VFL Football Club, of the Victorian Football League
- Collingwood Warriors SC, of the defunct National Soccer League

== Other uses ==
- Collingwood (surname), a list of people with the surname
- Collingwood (mansion), a historic mansion in Fort Hunt, Virginia
- Collingwood & Co., TV animation studio based in London
- Collingwood, a British Rail Class 50 locomotive
- Collingwood, a housing estate in Cramlington, England
- Collingwood Monument, a monument in Tynemouth, England, dedicated to Vice Admiral Lord Cuthbert Collingwood, a Napoleonic-era British admiral

== See also ==
- Collingwood Corner, Nova Scotia
- Collingwood station (disambiguation)
- Collingswood, New Jersey, a borough in Camden County, New Jersey
- Collinwood (disambiguation)
