= Collingwood (surname) =

Collingwood is an English surname. Notable people with the surname include:

- Charles Collingwood (1943–) Canadian-born British actor
- Charles Collingwood (1917–1985) American journalist and war correspondent
- Cuthbert Collingwood (died 1597), English landowner
- Cuthbert Collingwood, 1st Baron Collingwood (1748–1810), admiral of the Royal Navy
- Cuthbert Collingwood (1826–1908), English naturalist, surgeon and physician.
- Edward Collingwood (1900–1970), British mathematician
- Gabby Collingwood (born 1999), Australian rules footballer
- Harry Collingwood (1843–1922), pseudonym of William Joseph Cosens Lancaster, English engineer and writer of boy's adventure fiction
- Lawrance Collingwood (1887–1982), English conductor, composer and record producer
- Luke Collingwood, slave trader
- Lyn Collingwood (born 1936), Australian actress
- Monica Collingwood (January 5, 1908 – October 31, 1989), American film editor
- Paul Collingwood (1976–) English cricketer
- Robin George Collingwood, (1889–1943) philosopher and historian at Oxford University
- Roger Collingwood, British mathematician
- William Collingwood Smith (1815 – 1887 Brixton Hill), English watercolourist
- William Collingwood (1819 – 1903), English watercolourist, cousin of the last, father of the next
- W. G. Collingwood, William Gershom Collingwood (1854 - 1932), English author and artist
