= Harold H. Piffard =

British artist and aviator (1867–1939)

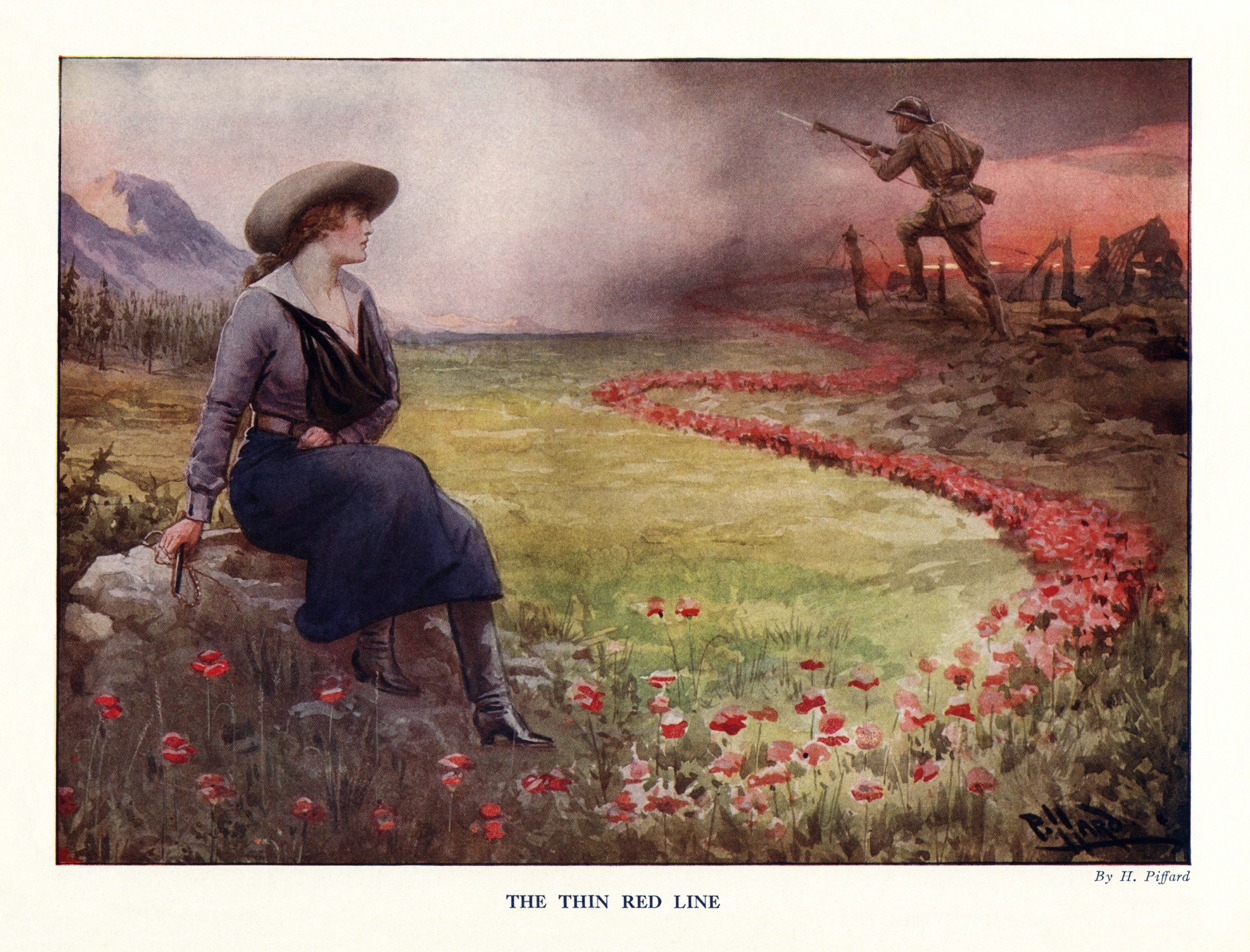
- The Thin Red Line by Piffard
- Born: 10 August 1867; Marylebone, London, England
- Died: 17 January 1939 (aged 71)
- Resting place: Old Chiswick Cemetery
- Known for: Artist; aviator; illustrator
- Movement: Orientalism
- Spouses: Helena Katherine Docetti Walker (m. 1895; died 1900); Eleanor Margaret Hoile (m. 1902)

Harold Hume Piffard (10 August 1867 – 17 January 1939) was a British artist, illustrator, and one of the first British aviators. He studied art at the Royal Academy Schools in London, exhibiting his first painting at the Royal Academy in 1895. He painted a wide variety of subjects in oils and watercolour, including history paintings. At the same time he worked as an illustrator, both for periodicals such as The Strand Magazine and The Illustrated London News, and illustrating novels. From 1907 he became interested in aviation, and began flying in 1909 in an aircraft he built himself. He made his first flights in West London near his Chiswick home; in 1910 he flew at Shoreham-by-Sea, near his old school, Lancing College.

== Personal life ==
Harold Hume Piffard was born in Marylebone, the sixth son of Charles Piffard and his wife Emily, née Hume, the daughter of James Hume, a barrister and Magistrate at Calcutta. They had married in Calcutta on 1 June 1858. Charles was Clerk of the Crown in the High Court of Calcutta; Piffard's four eldest brothers were all born in India. Harold was educated at Lancing College, being sent there together with his older brother Lawrence in 1877. He briefly ran away from school to find employment on the stage, sleeping on the Embankment for several nights while he visited theatres and music halls. In February 1884, he travelled around India and worked on a tea plantation. In 1889, he returned to London and began to study art at the Royal Academy Schools, exhibiting his first painting at the Royal Academy in 1895. On 4 June 1895 he married Helena Walker at St John's Free Church in Dundee. They had four children. Helena died soon after giving birth to her fourth child in 1900; the baby died a few months later. In 1902, Piffard married Eleanor Hoile in Edinburgh; they had one son, and lived in Addison Road (now Addison Grove), Bedford Park, Chiswick, in the west of London. Piffard died on 17 January 1939.

== Artist ==
=== Painter ===
Piffard painted a wide variety of subjects in both oils and watercolour. He made his reputation by exhibiting large history paintings at the Royal Academy, on four occasions between 1895 and 1899. The best-known of these was Saragossa 10 February 1809. The scholar of literature Philip V. Allingham describes this as "dramatically (one might even say, sensationally) depict[ing] Napoleon's forces brutally putting down the resistance of Spanish patriots inside the cathedral of Zaragoza during the Peninsular War".

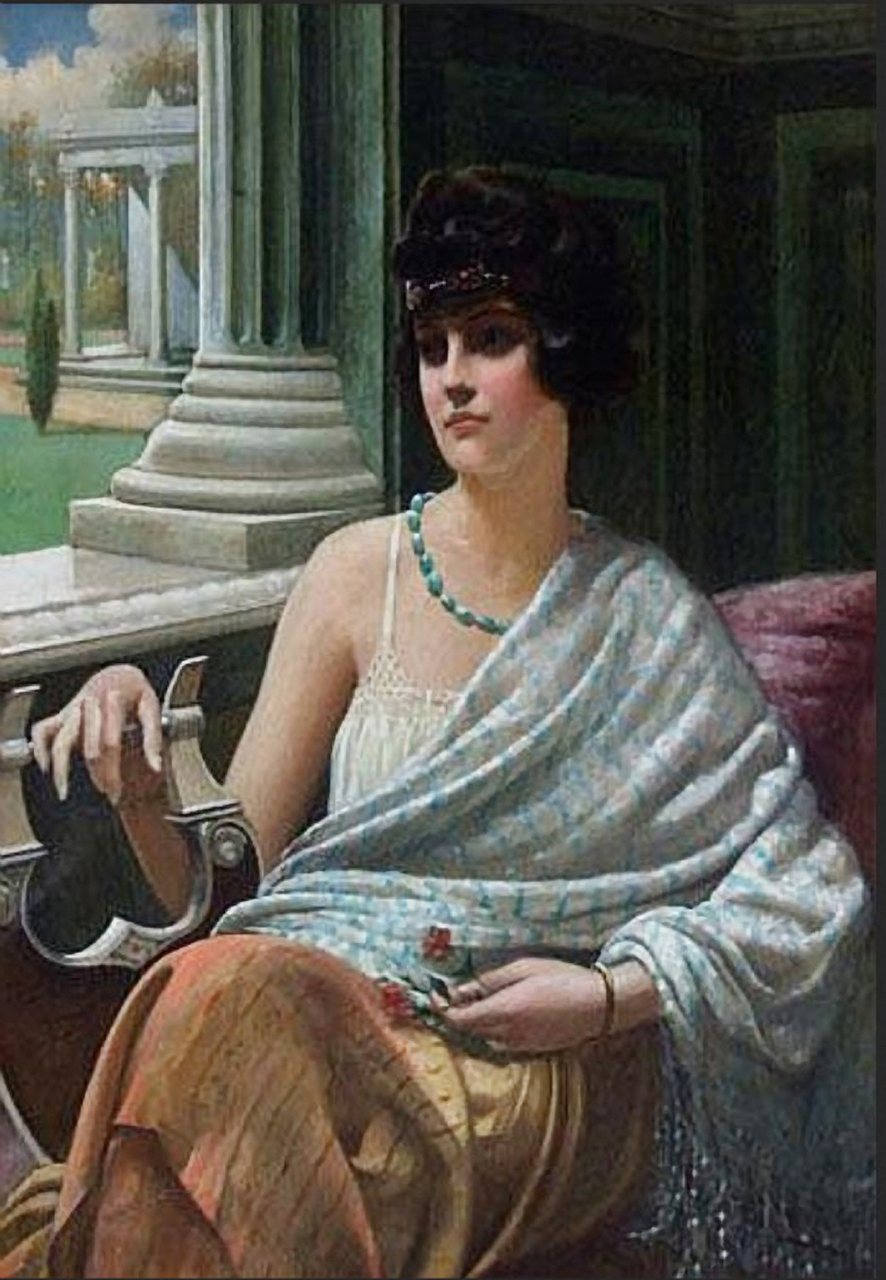
Classical scene

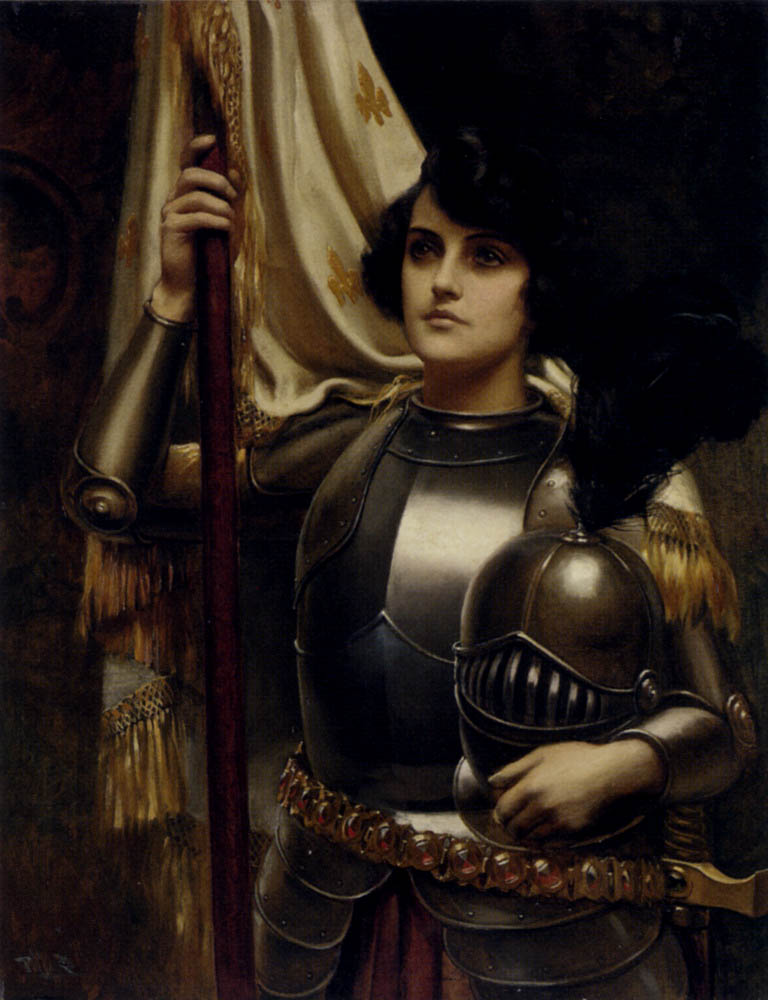
Joan of Arc

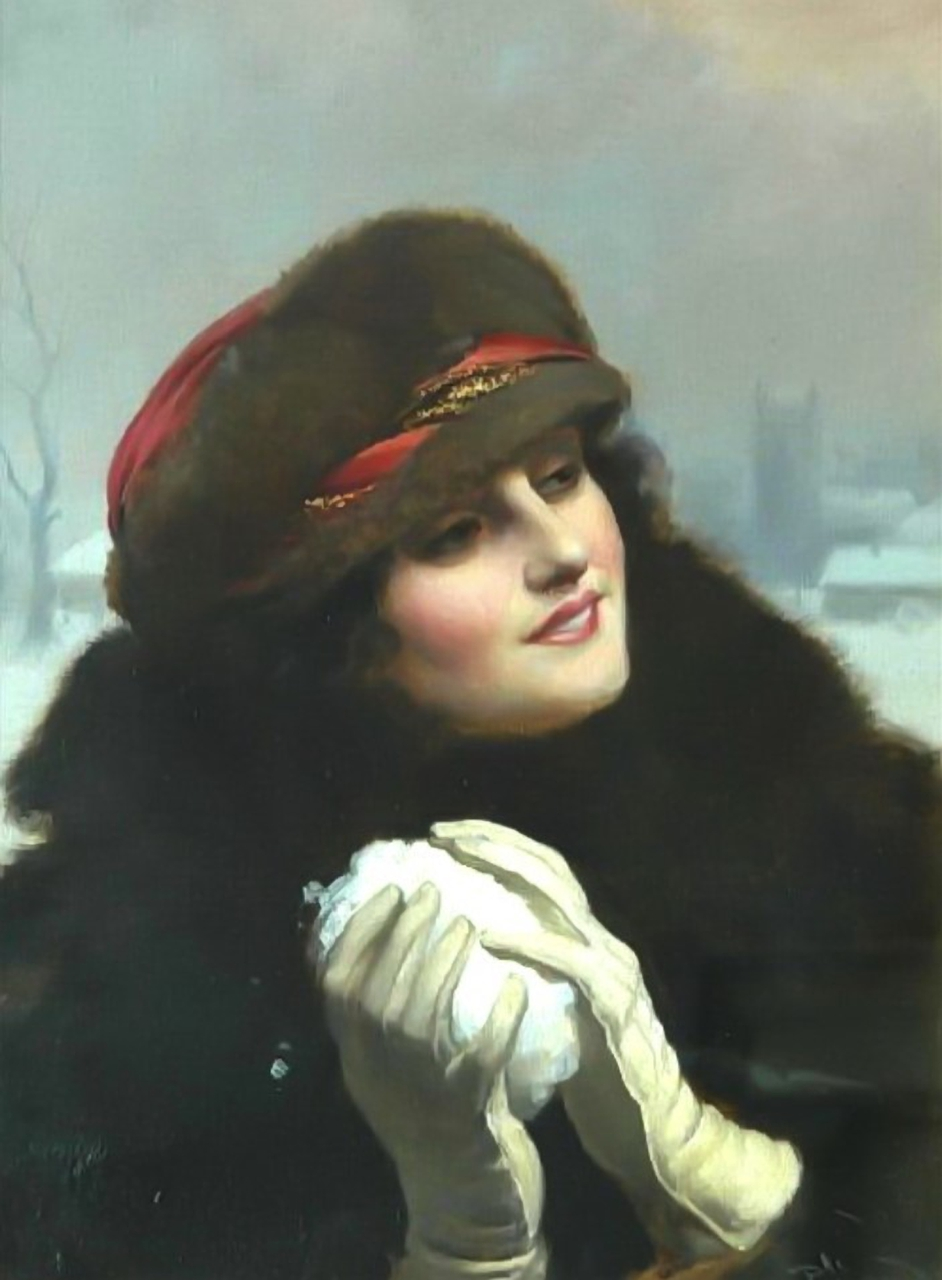
Snowballing

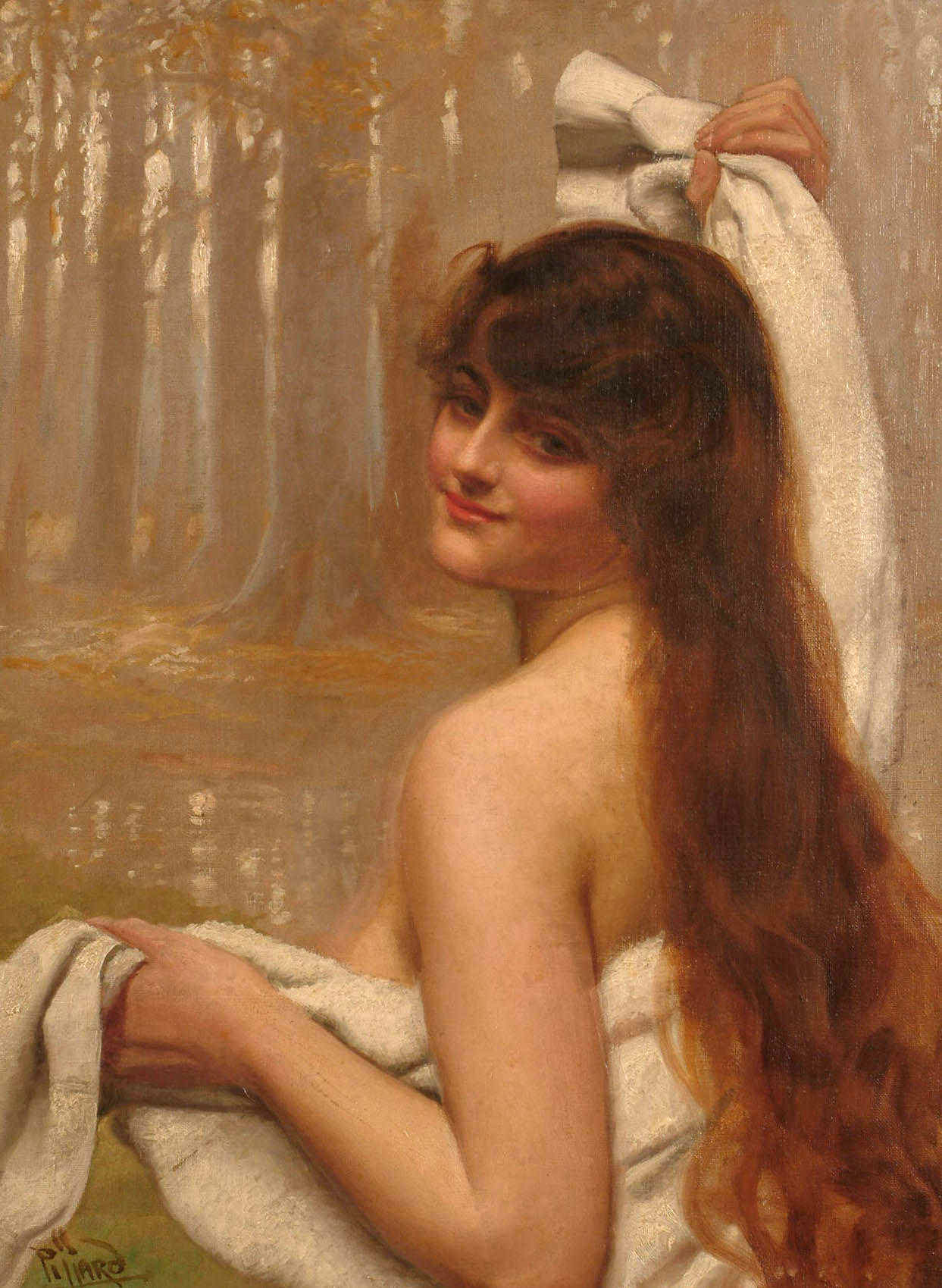
Bather

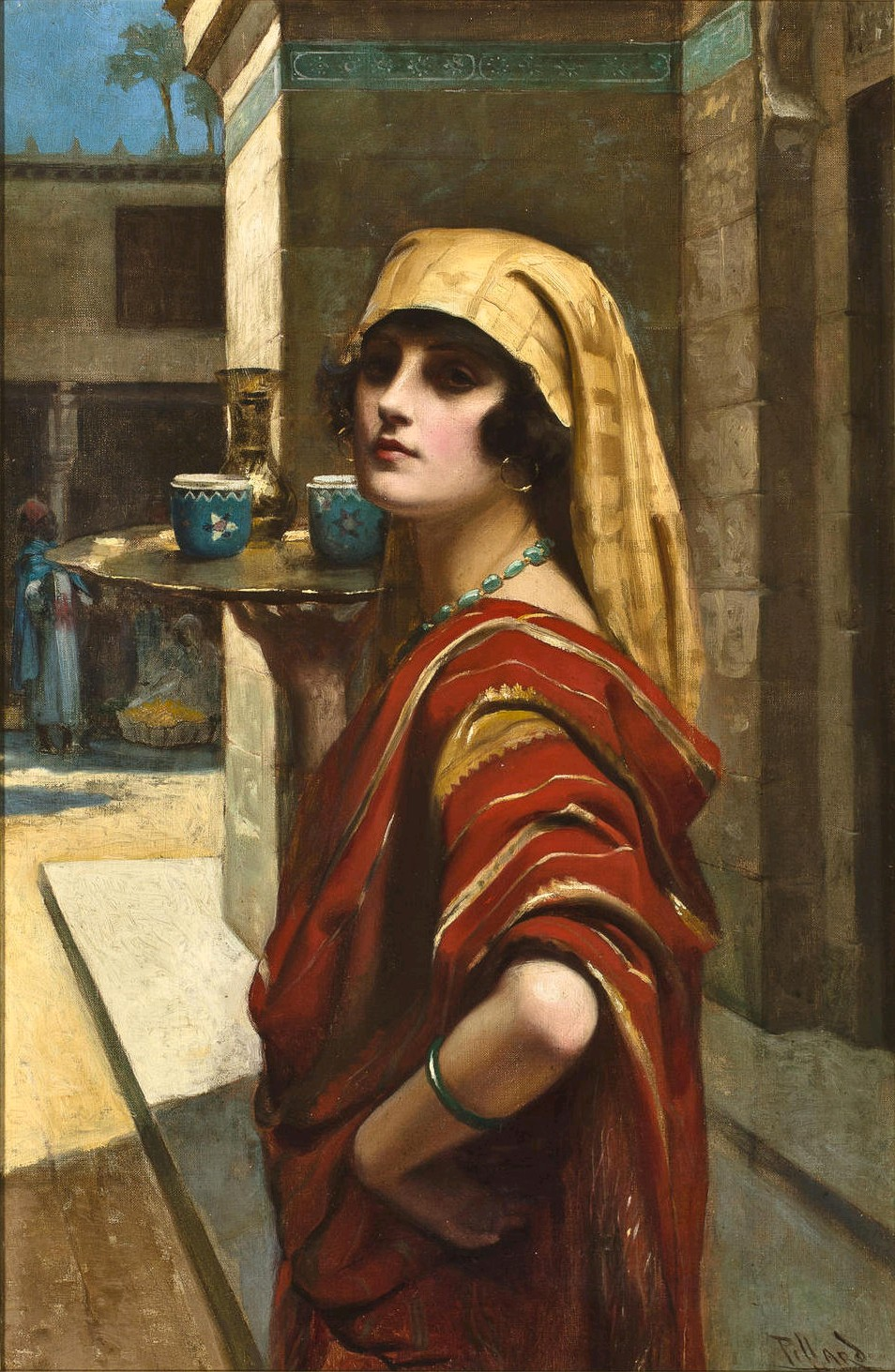
Odalisque

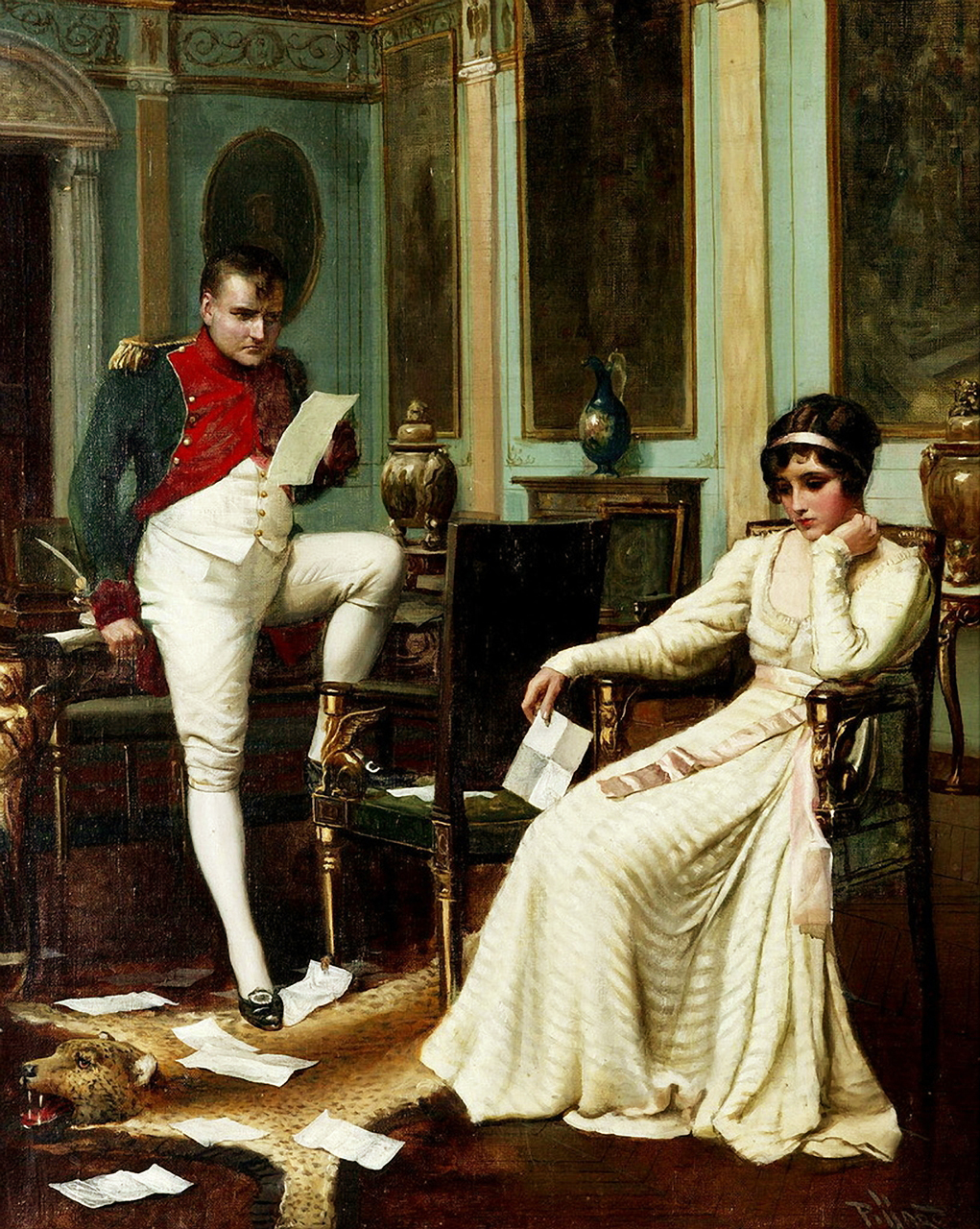
Napoleon history painting

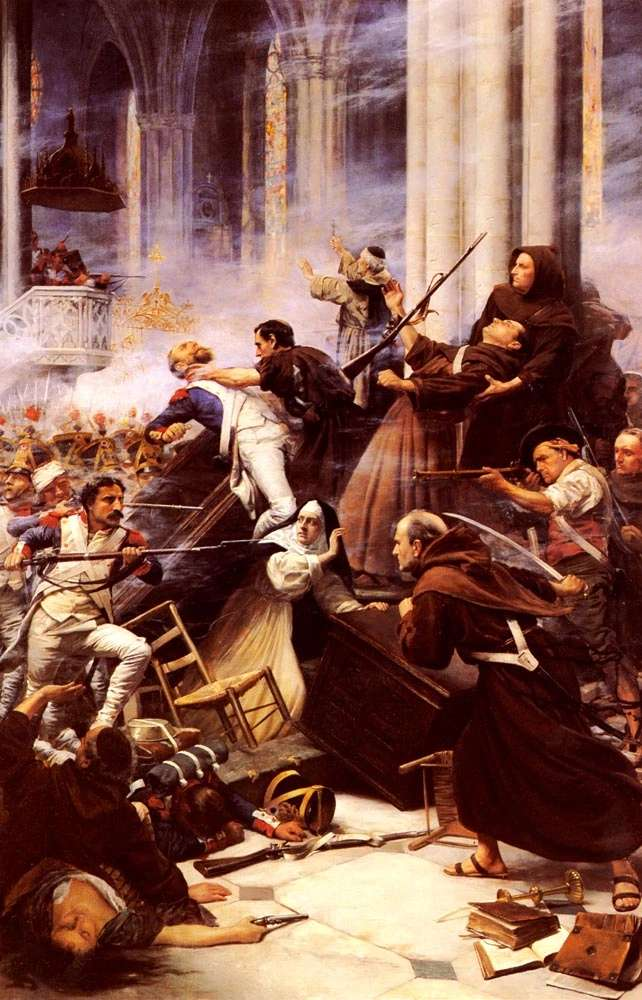
French assault on Saragossa, 10 February 1809
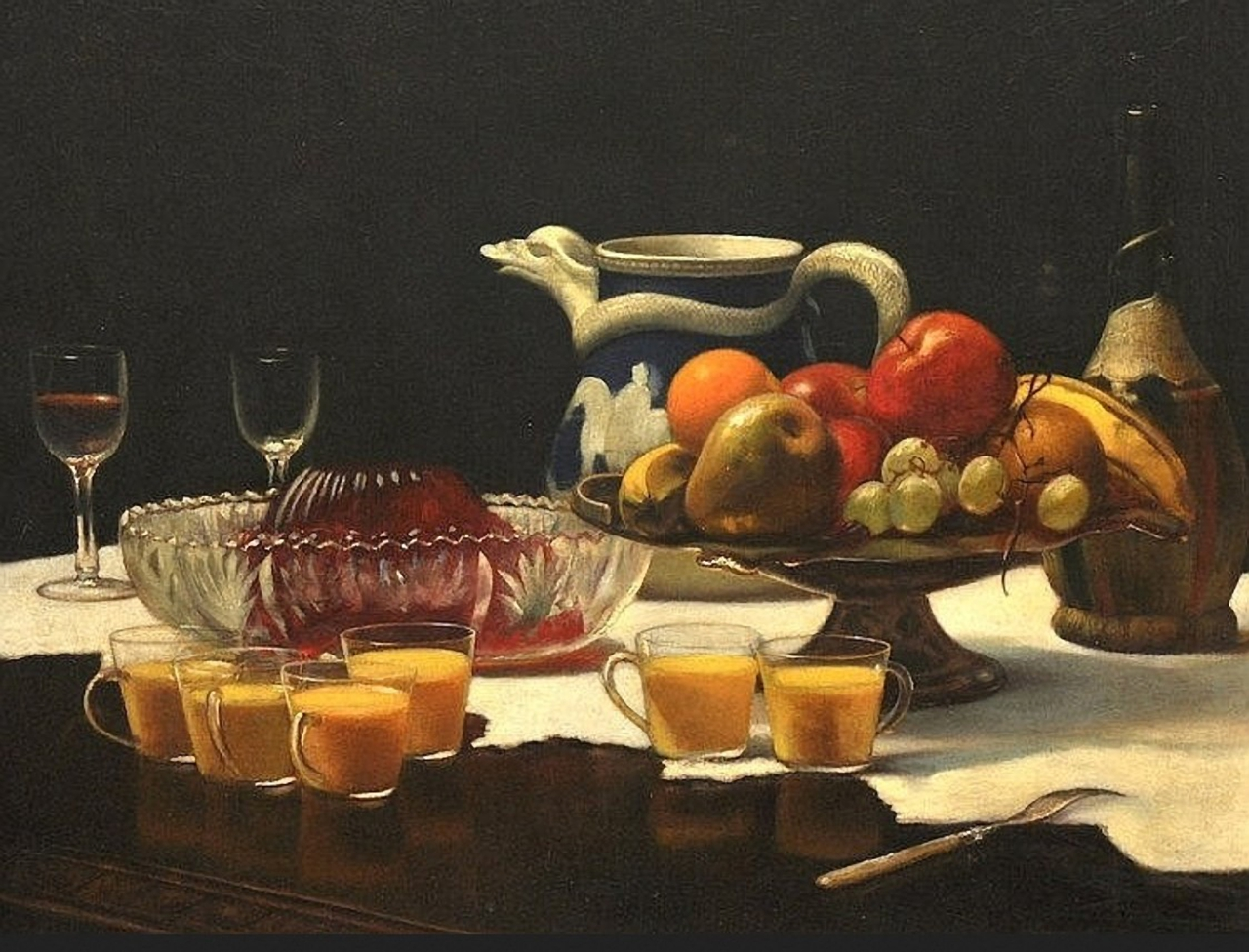
Still life

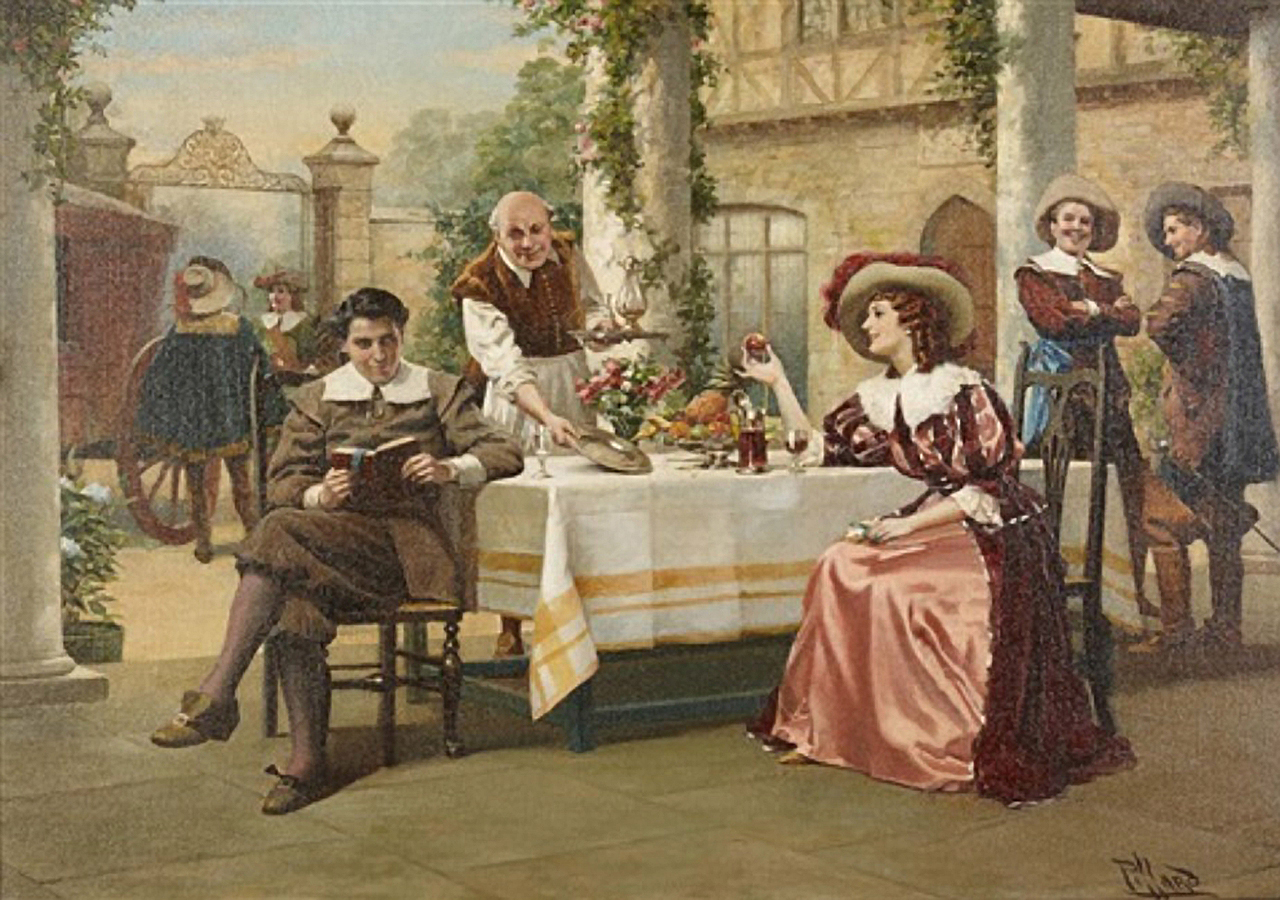
Courtship history painting

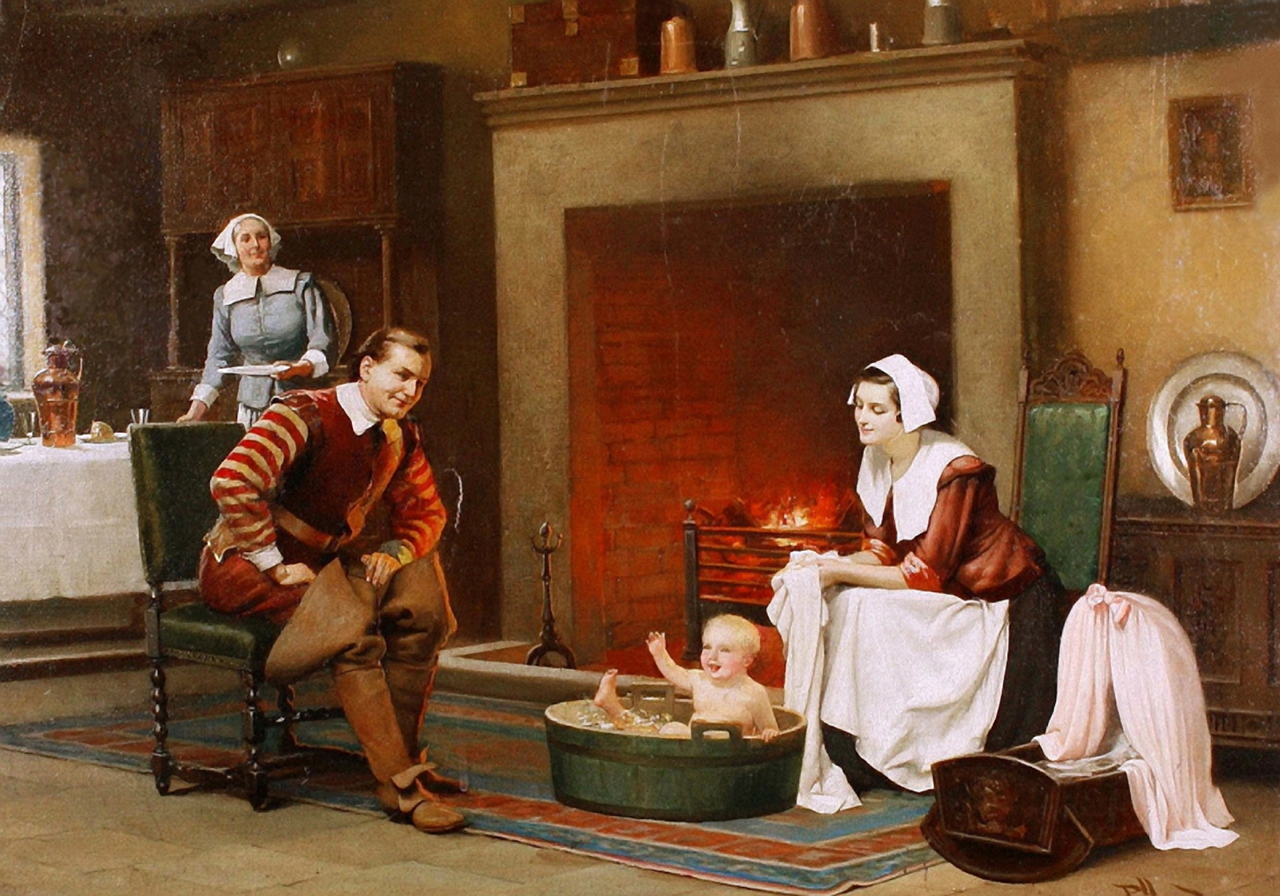
Jacobean bathtime scene

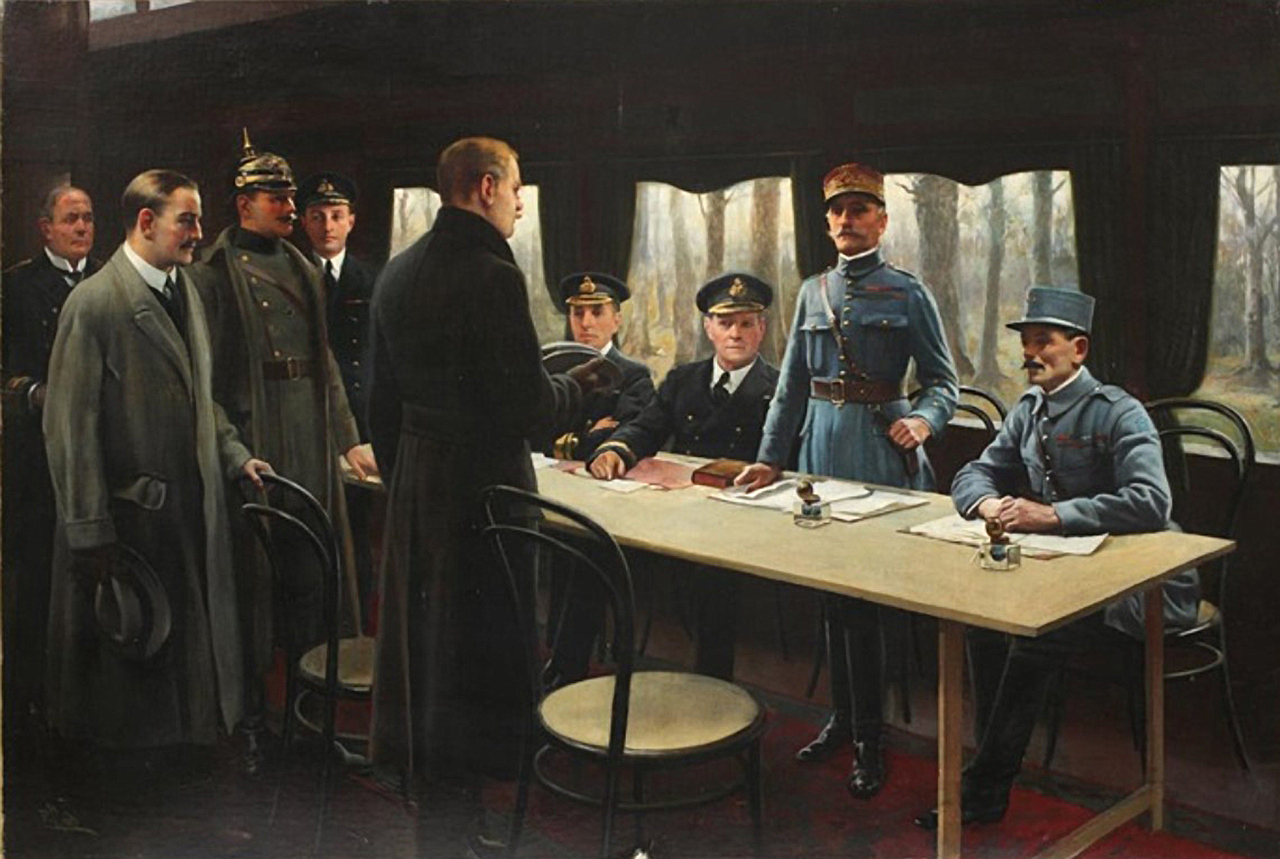
The Signing of the Armistice, Nov. 11th, 1918

=== Illustrator ===
Piffard started his work as an illustrator in 1894 with contributions to periodicals including The Strand Magazine, The Illustrated London News and The Penny Pictorial Magazine. He began to illustrate books in 1895, eventually illustrating over a hundred novels, many of them for the Society for Promoting Christian Knowledge, by authors including Frances Hodgson Burnett, Guy Boothby, Harry Collingwood, Mrs. Henry Wood, Richard Marsh, Max Pemberton, and J. M. Neale. From 1908 he illustrated a series of classics for Collins including works by Thackeray, Dickens, and George Eliot.

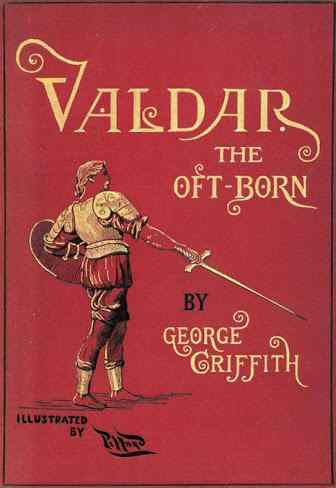
Cover of George Griffith's Valdar the Oft-born, 1895, signed lower left

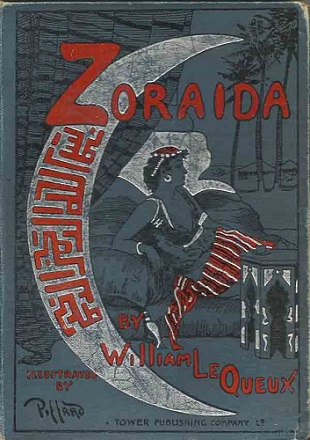
Cover of William le Queux's Zoraida, 1895, signed lower left

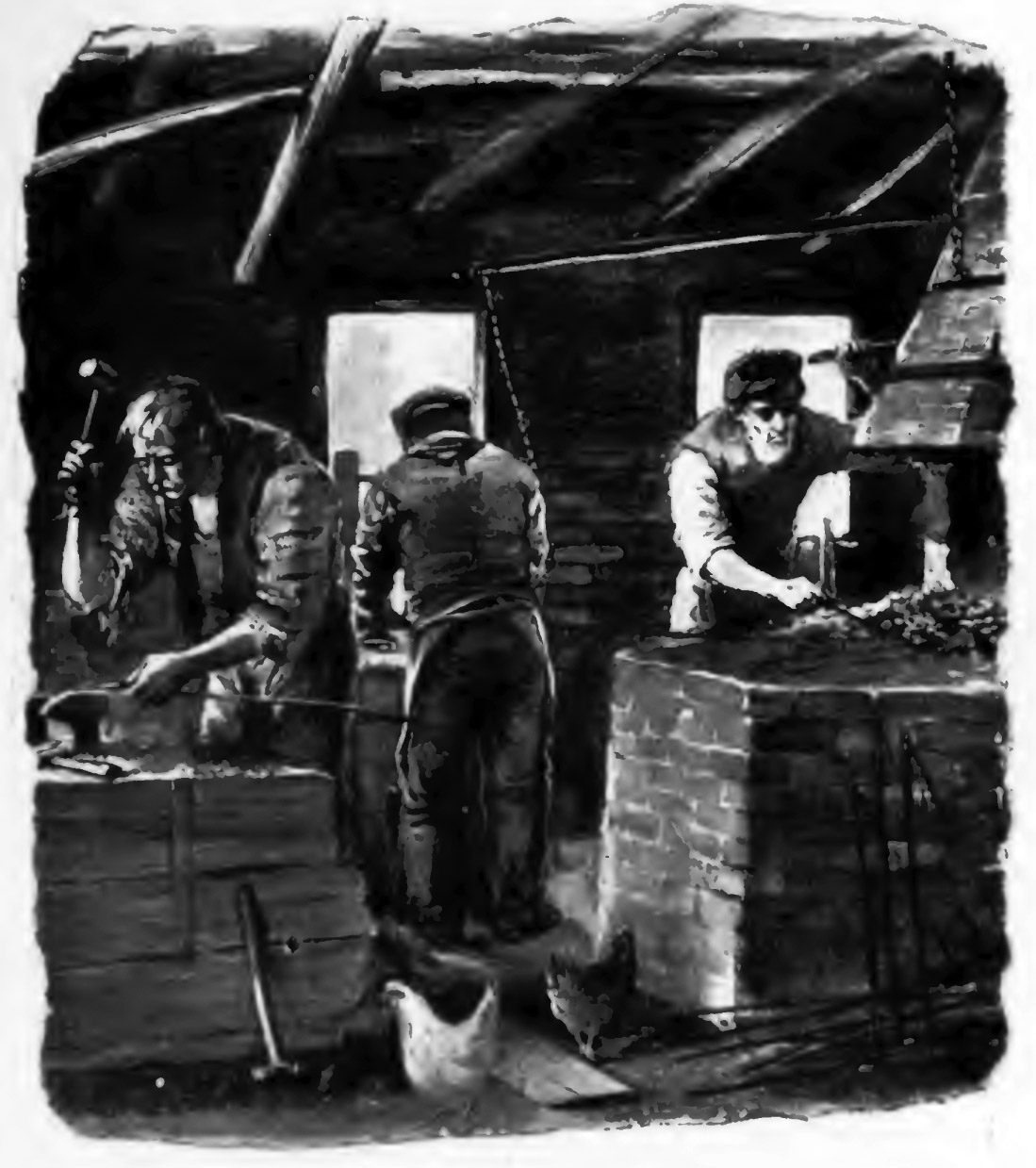
Interior of a Bromsgrove Nailmaker's shed, 1896

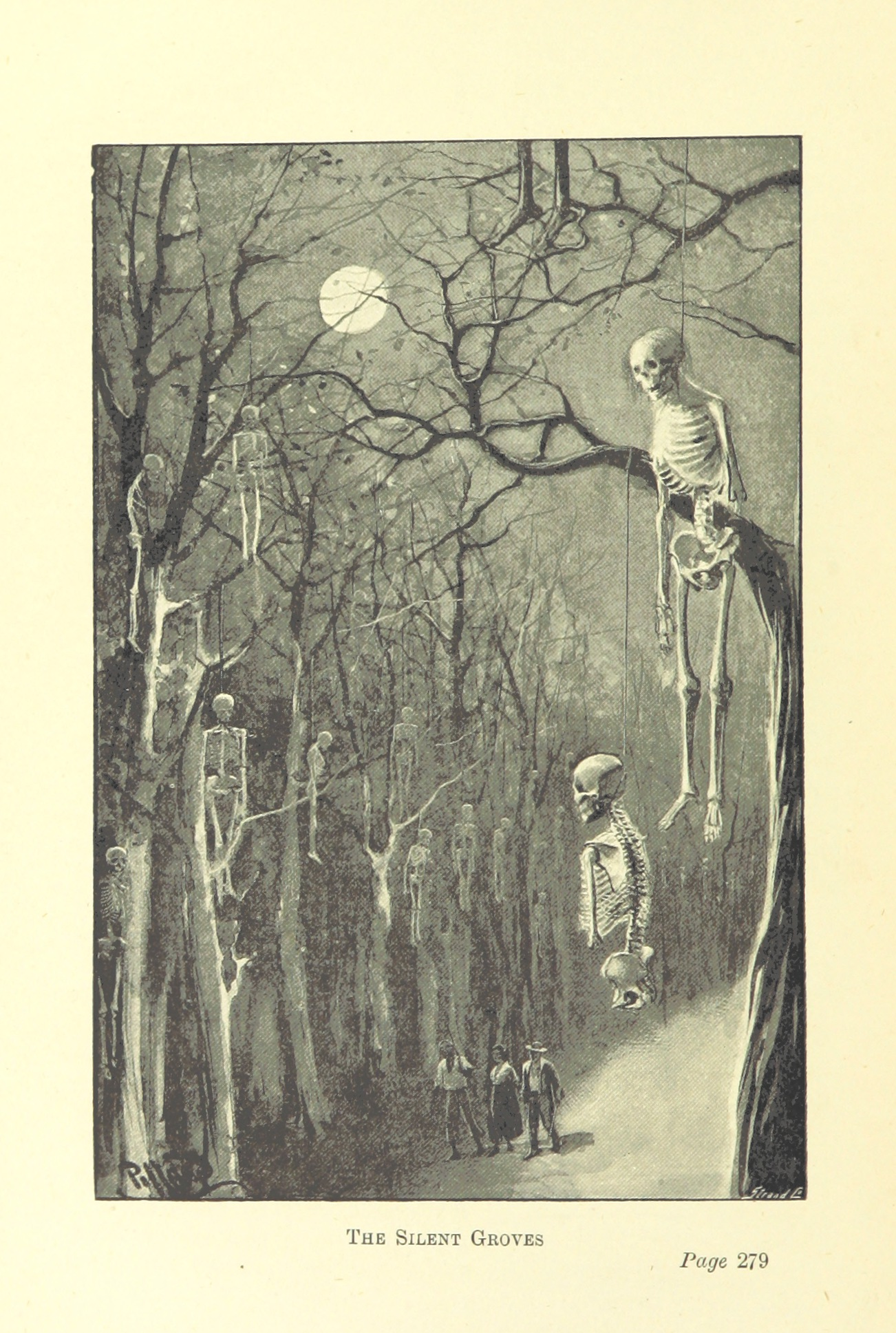
"The Silent Groves", plate on page 279 of Sibyl Falcon. A study in romantic morals by Alfred Edgar Jepson, 1895

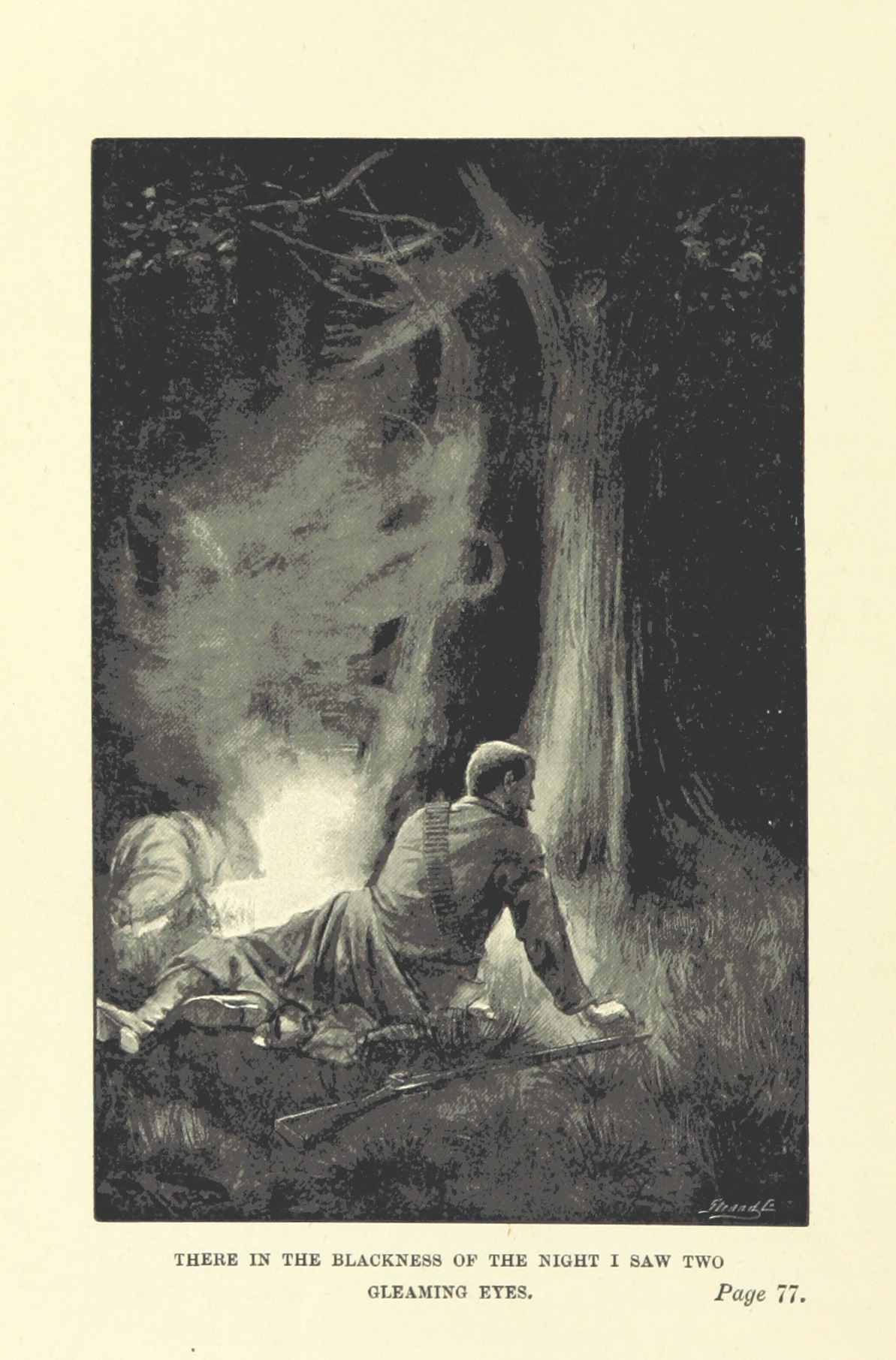
"There in the blackness of the night I saw two gleaming eyes", plate on page 77 of The City of Gold by Edward Markwick, 1896

=== Example of a full set of illustrations ===
The following set of six illustrations were made by Piffard for Geoffrey Harrington's Adventures by Harry Collingwood. This was published by the Society for Promoting Christian Knowledge in 1907.

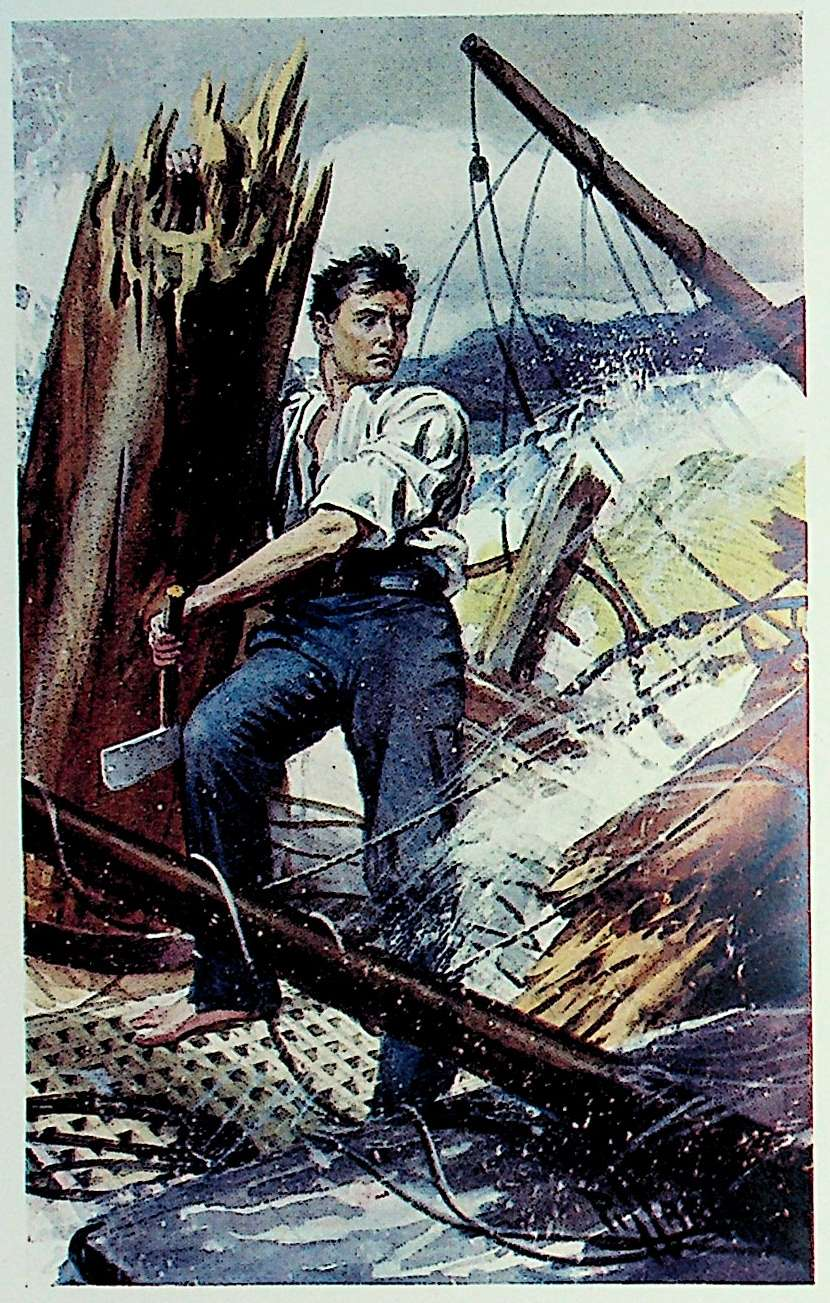
Geoffrey Harrington holds onto the stump of the mast while attempting to cut free the broken mast and rigging

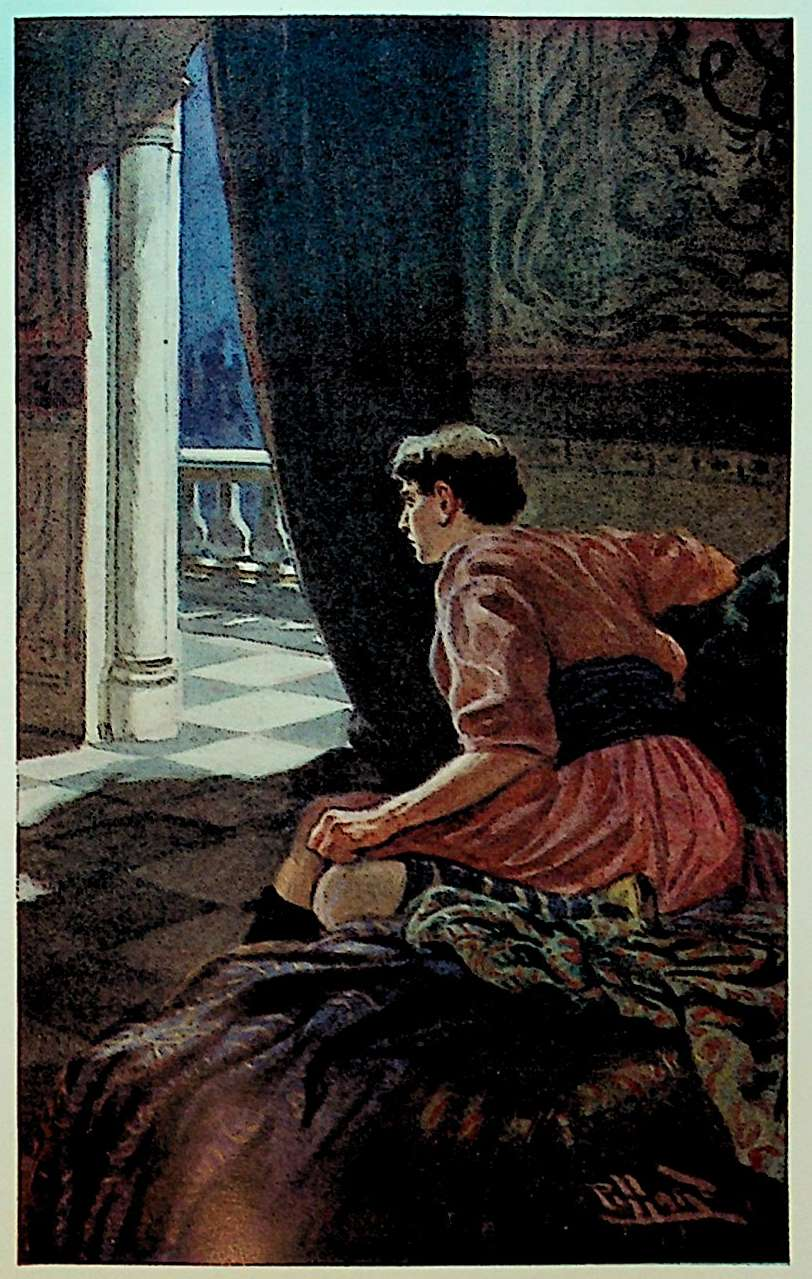
Geoffrey Harrington foils an assassination attempt

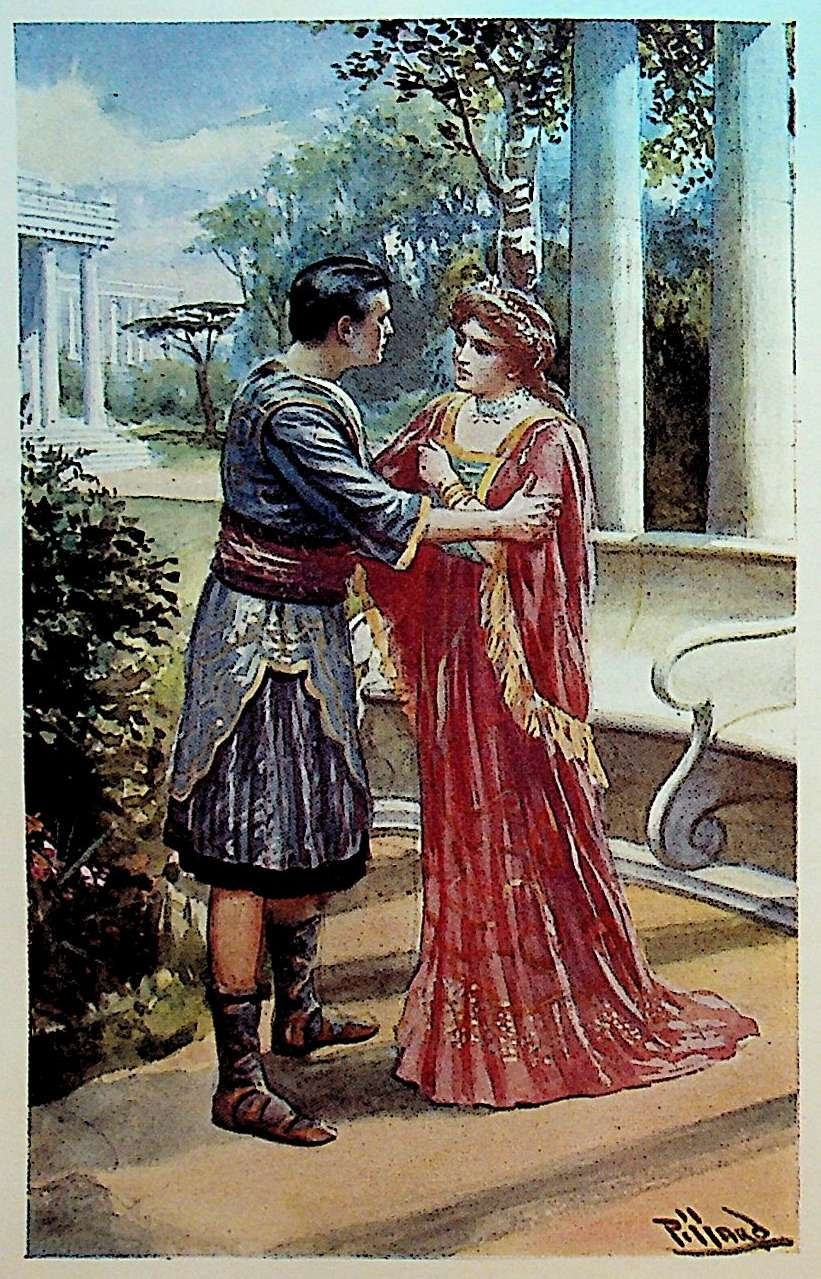
Geoffrey Harrington and the Queen plight their troth to each other

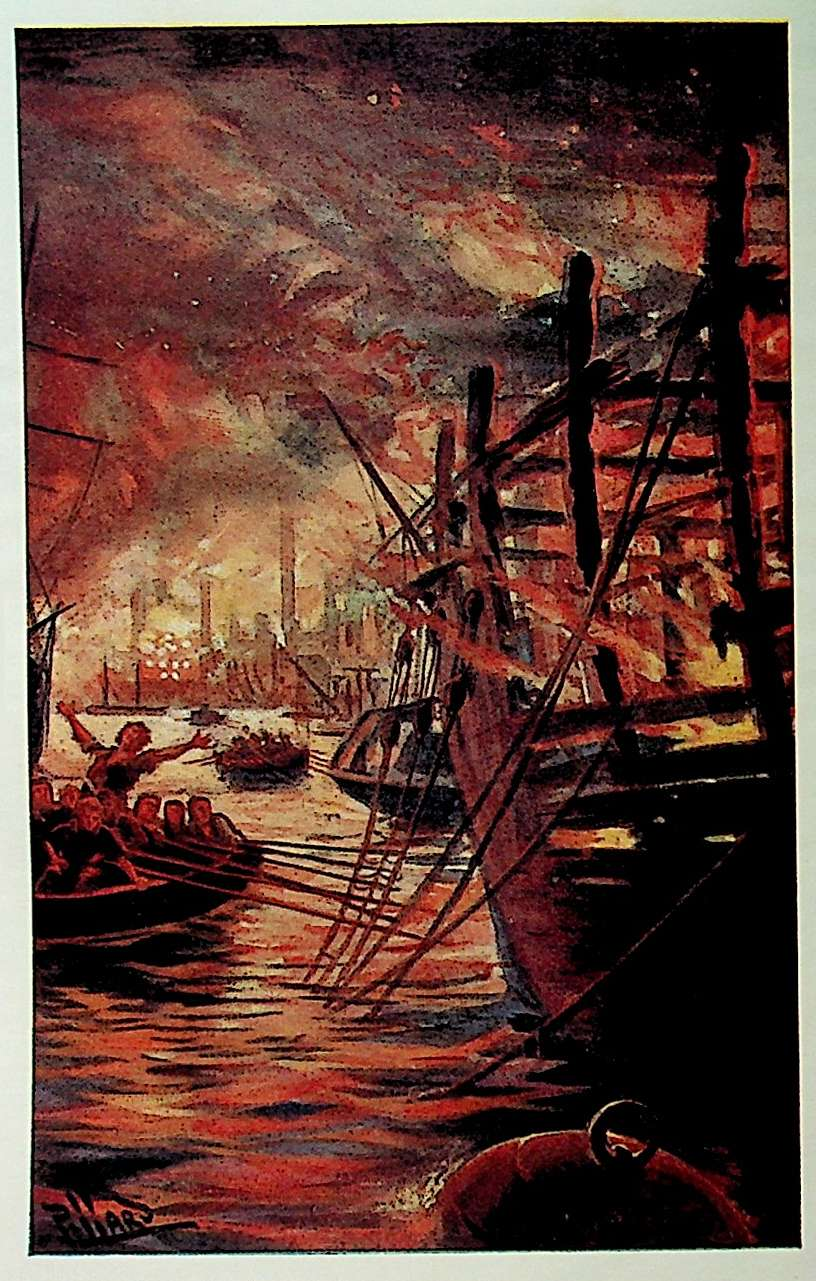
The Avelians set the Tutan Dockyard on fire

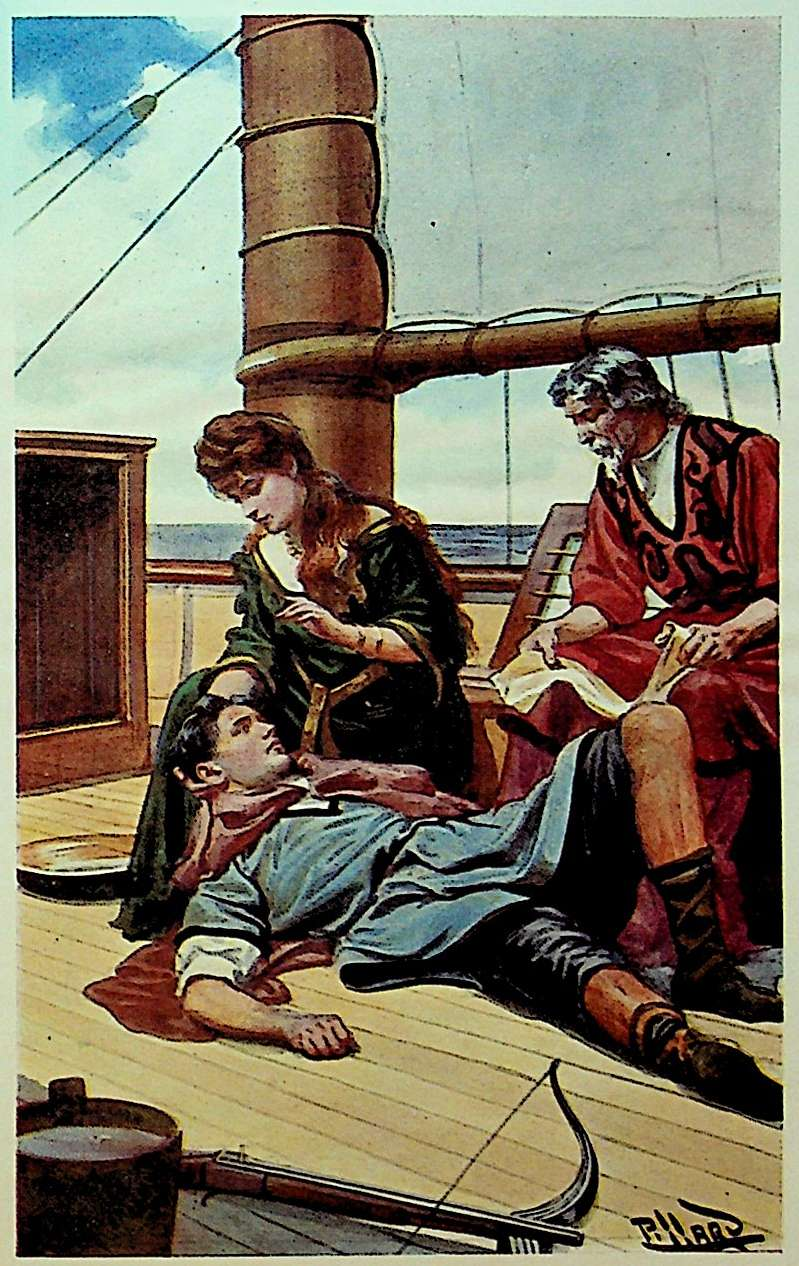
Geoffrey Harrington is succoured by his Royal Sweetheart

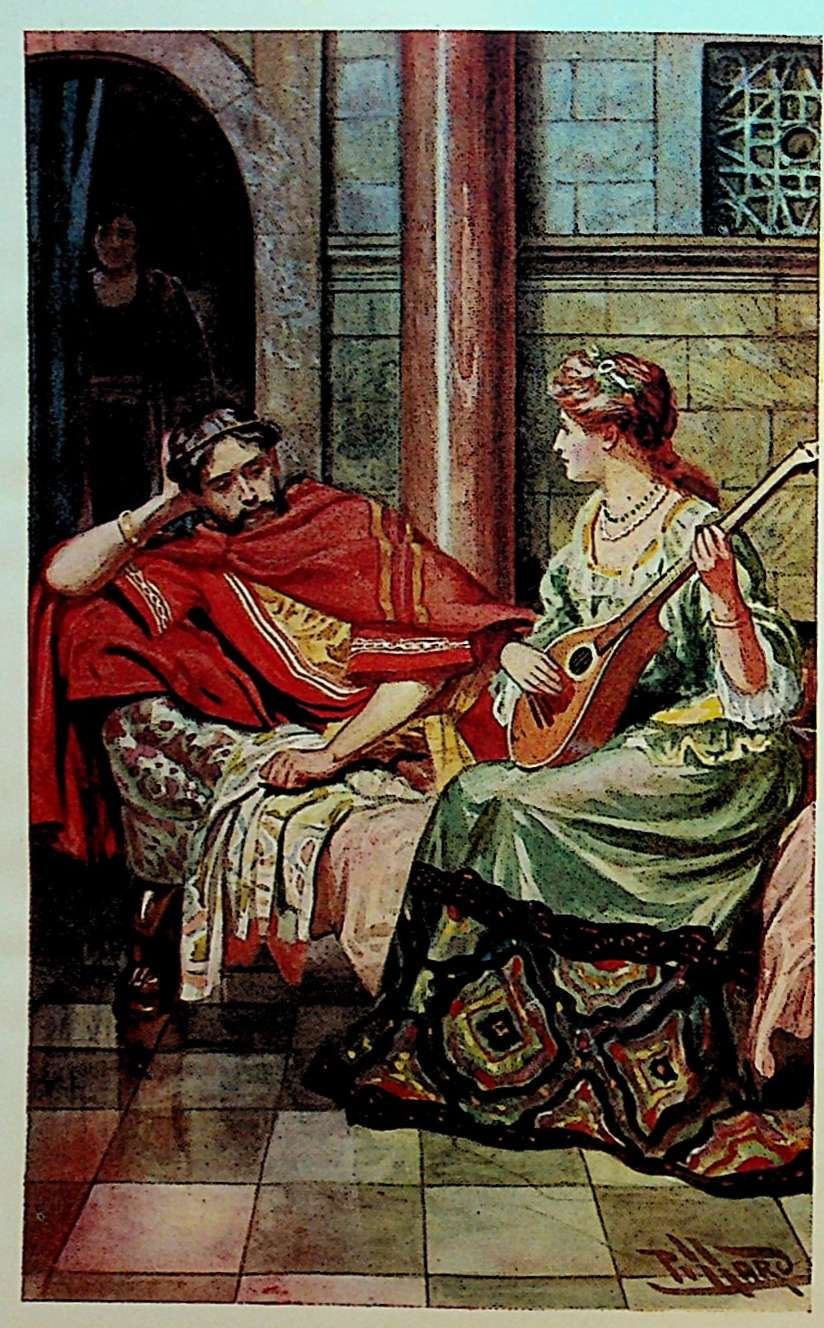
The deposed Tutan King listens to music

== Aviator ==
=== First flights in Ealing ===
Piffard began making model aircraft in 1907, winning a prize for one of them at Olympia in 1909. He began to fly in 1909, using an 8-cylinder 40 horsepower ENV 'D' engine and building the airframe in his studio; he rented a shed on Back Common Road, Turnham Green, near his home to assemble the aircraft, which was a biplane with an elevator in front of the wing, and a variable-pitch propeller. From September 1909 he tested the aircraft on a rented field in Ealing to the west of Masons Lane at what was then Hangar Hill Farm (not the same as the later Acton Aerodrome, which was on the other side of Masons Lane). He managed to get the plane airborne and fly "a foot or two from the ground for a distance of a hundred yards or so." However, on 3 December 1909 the aircraft and its marquee hangar were destroyed in a storm.

=== Flying at Shoreham ===
Piffard in his hand-built aircraft Hummingbird on the Shoreham field where he flew it, 1910

Piffard then co-founded (with George Wingfield, a lawyer) the Aviator's Finance Company, which took out a lease on land at Shoreham-by-Sea near his old school, Lancing College, which already possessed a hangar. With Edouard Baumann and two assistants, they reworked the aircraft's design and had Hummingbird ready on 3 May 1910. It was able to take off in short hops, earning it the nickname of "The Grasshopper"; it frequently crashed because of the hidden ditches in the grass. In September 1910 he flew at a height of 30 or 40 feet for half a mile, managing to fly right across the field to a nearby hotel, The Sussex Pad, "in about 40 seconds". He had not learnt how to turn the plane in the air, and the plane had to be wheeled back to the hangar, as there was no space to take off near the hotel, but he celebrated with champagne all the same.

A local cinematograph company asked to film a flight, and he confidently accepted; Colin Manton describes this as characteristic hubris. Ignoring warnings of a dangerous ditch, he tried to fly over it, destroying the aircraft in a "comprehensive smash" which was recorded on film. The cameraman recalled that Piffard still "seemed in no way disappointed; in fact, I thought I saw a gleam of satisfaction in his eye".

In 1911 Piffard unsuccessfully tested a new aircraft, the Piffard Hydroplane, which had floats as well as wheels, on Shoreham beach. He developed no more aircraft and did not attempt to fly again, working as an artist and illustrator. The land at Shoreham became Shoreham Airport. In 2007 the Shoreham Airport Historical Association built a replica of Piffard's Hummingbird.
