= Percival Lancaster =

Scottish writer

William Arthur Percy Lancaster
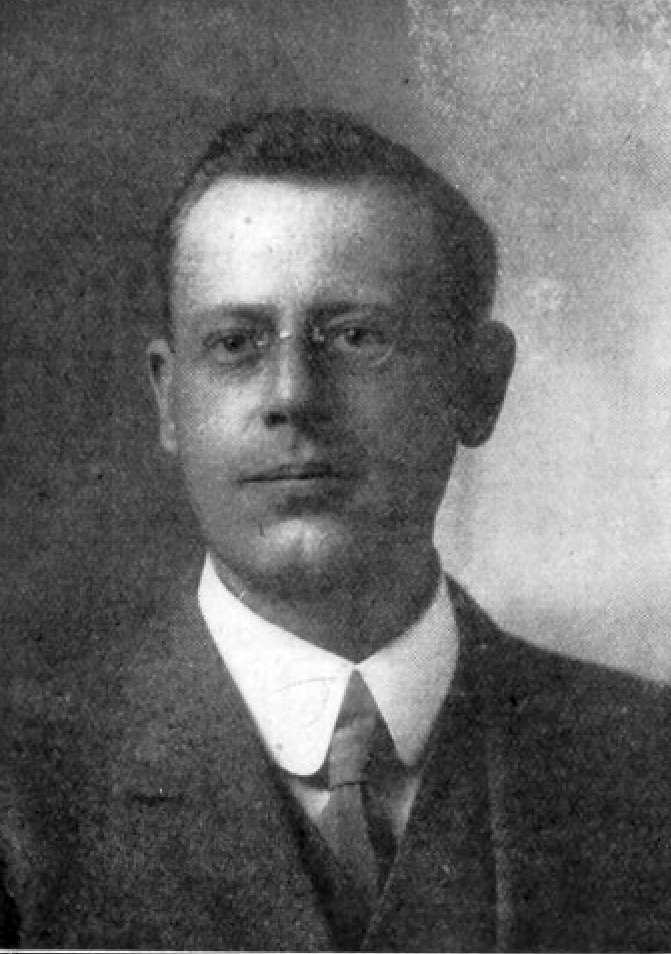
- Percival Lancaster in Canada in 1912
- Born: 24 February 1880; Burntisland, Fife, Scotland
- Died: 25 October 1937 (aged 57); Auckland, New Zealand
- Other name: Percival Lancaster
- Occupations: Civil engineer and author
- Years active: 1912–1914
- Known for: Writing boys' adventure fiction
- Notable work: Capt. Jack O'Hara, R.N.

Percival Lancaster (24 February 1880 – 25 October 1937) was a British civil engineer and a writer of boy's adventure fiction, whose career was derailed by the First World War. Although his full name was William Arthur Percy Lancaster, he generally used the form Percival Lancaster.

== Early life ==
Lancaster was born at 8:30am on 24 February 1880 in Burntisland, Fife, on the northern banks of the Firth of Forth in Scotland. Although born in Scotland, his family soon left Scotland and he never identified himself as Scottish. His father was William Joseph Cosens Lancaster (23 May 1843 – 10 June 1922), a civil engineer better known as Harry Collingwood, a writer of boys' adventure fiction, usually with a nautical setting. His mother has Kezia Hannah Rice Oxley (January 1848 – 18 April 1928) who, like her husband's two sisters, the 1871 census shows as working a draper's assistant in Liverpool. The couple had married two years previously on 10 July 1878, at Conisborough near Doncaster.

Lancaster attended Dulwich College, at a time when Arthur Herman Gilkes, who promoted scholarship and public service, was the master, and Dulwich was one of the leading public schools. Lancaster described himself as being one of the school's prizemen. He went on a tour of the continent to perfect his French and German. Lancaster prided himself on his linguistic ability and said in a 1909 interview that he could speak French, German, and Zulu.

== Work and marriages ==
Lancaster then began work for Sir John Jackson on the extension of the Keyham Yard at Devonport Royal Dockyard, near Plymouth. The 1901 census found him boarding at Plymouth, close to his work. The extension cost three to four million pounds and was, up until then, the largest work, apart from the Manchester Ship Canal (Note: Sir John Jackson was knighted for this work on the Manchester Ship Canal.) ever let in England as a single contract. Work began on the extension in March 1896. After working for John Jackson for six years, Lancaster moved to Natal to take up an appointment with the Natal Government. In later years Lancaster said that he had served in the Boer War, but in his profile interview in the Canadian Bookseller, he does not refer to the war, but only to strange experience and unpleasant adventures centering on strike-breaking and hunting. (Note: Born in 1880, he was unlikely to have started work for Sir John Jackson until 1896 (when works on Keyham started) or 1897 when he would have been 17, a normal age for finishing Public School. He worked for John Jackson for six years, meaning that the earliest he could have gone to South Africa was March or April 1902. The Second Boer War was virtually over at that stage, formally ending on 31 May 1902. Further in his enlistment papers in December 1914, Lancaster stated that he had been three years in the Border Mounted Rifles, and had resigned on 6 January 1906, again suggesting that his service in this volunteer unit had begun after the end of the Second Boer War.)

Lancaster was invalided home from South Africa in late 1905 or early 1906 and began writing stories. Lancaster married his maternal first cousin, Evelyn Mary Hall Oxley (January 1882 – 21 June 1967), in a registry office in Devenport. Marriage between first cousins was legal in the UK and George Darwin found that 3.5% of marriages among the landed gentry and upper middle class in 1870 were between first-cousin marriages. The prevalence of such marriages then declined and a 1960 study found that only 1 out of 25,000 marriages in the middle class in London was between first cousins.

William Lancaster	Ann Cosens	George Oxley	Mary Rice
Sarah and Ada Lancaster	Harry Collingwood	Kezia H R Oxley	Ann Eliza Hall	Edward Charles Rice Oxley	Emily Armstrong	Mary, George, Melicent, Thomas, Agustus, Alfred, Leonard and Frederick Oxley
Percival Lancaster	Evelyn Mary Hall Oxley	Edward, Agusta, Alice and Frederick Oxley	Kenneth, Alan, and Joan Rice-Oxley

This was only the first time the couple married. In his first marriage, Lancaster used the name Percival Lancaster, a name which does not appear on his Birth Certificate (it's William Arthur Percy on the Birth Certificate). This may have led to some bureaucratic problems as he and Evelyn remarried using his birth certificate names in Bushey in on 20 April 1909. Immediately after this marriage the couple emigrated to Canada aboard the Corsican, arriving in Quebec in May 1909.

In Canada, Lancaster worked at a range of jobs. The Bookseller and Stationer of February 1911 gave notice of the formation of the Waverly Book Company of Canada, of which Lancaster was one of the principals and was shown as the manager in the Toronto City Directory. In July 1912 Lancaster was working for the Toronto Harbour Commissioners.

By March 1913, Lancaster was leaving a job with the Canadian Pacific Railway, where he had been a construction engineer on the route through Hastings, Ontario (Note: There is no longer a railway through Hastings, but the old permanent way is now the Lang-Hastings Trail.) Lancaster then began work as city engineer, architect, and waterworks manager for Belleville, Ontario at the respectable salary of 1,800CAD per year.

== Writing ==
In December 1907, Lancaster published the story "Mun Sami's Revenge: A Story of the Natal Sugar Plantations" in The Wide World Magazine. This magazine asked for contributors to write about their real life experiences, and authors commonly stated how they were aware of the story. Lancaster said that "I was at Shepstone, Natal, in the employ of the Government, when the affair happened. I know all the people concerned quite intimately, with the exception of the unfortunate De Vaux."

Lancaster's first book Captain Jack O'Hara was published by Sampson Low in 1908. They were the first publisher to whom Lancaster had offered the work, and had previously published two of his father's novels. In the preface, Lancaster describes the book as "a modest attempt... to show that under certain conditions and even in time of peace the naval service of to-day affords as much opportunity for dashing and romantic adventure as was to be found afloat in the stirring days of Drake and his fellow Elizabethan heroes." The book was favourably received:

- "one of those romances of the navy so dear to the heart of every lad worth his salt" – Sheffield Daily Telegraph.
- "Mr Lancaster, at any rate, has succeeded, with remarkable verisimilitude, in giving us a vigorous and exciting picture of the sea-life of the present day and introducing incidents quite within the possibility of the varied duties now imposed upon the 'handy man.'" – Aberdeen Press and Journal.
- "The book embodies a vivid account of life upon a modern warship, with many thrilling adventures, told in a fresh and convincing way." – Portadown News.

In 1909, Lancaster wrote a short story, "Ship of Silence: A Tale of the New Canadian Navy" for MacLeans Busy Man's Magazine.

Lancaster's next book was In the power of the Enemy written together with his father, Harry Collingwood. While the book was only published as a novel by Sampson Low in 1925, it was published as a serial in 1912. Lancaster's third book, Chaloner of the Bengal Cavalry, a tale of the Indian Mutiny, was published by Blackie in October 1915.

In July 1912, Lancaster said that a further book of his, The Serpent, set in New Zealand, had been accepted by Sampson Low, and that the manuscript of a fourth was taken to England (from Canada) by the managing director of Sampson Low. However, The Serpent does not appear in the British Library catalogue, nor in the Jisc collated catalogues, nor in the trade press, so it is questionable whether it was published. As for the fourth book, an unpublished manuscript: The Fourth Temptation. The Love Story of Mary Magdalene. written by Lancaster and Harry Collingwood was offered for sale on AbeBooks in January 2020.

After the war, Lancaster wrote almost nothing. The story A deal in Black Ivory was published as a serial story in Chums on 8 September 1924 and 5 October 1924, but it is not clear if this was newly written. In 1925, Sampson Low finally published In the Power of the Enemy which Lancaster had written together with his father and which had appeared as a serial in 1912. In 1933, Lancaster wrote Vanished Lands: Atlantis and Lemuria, (Note: Lemuria is a hypothetical lost land located in either the Indian or the Pacific Ocean, as postulated by a now-discredited 19th-century scientific theory.) a very short essay, for the New Zealand Herald.

== The First World War ==
Lancaster returned to England in time to enlist on 14 December 1914 at Cockspur Street. He was 34 years old. He was posted as a private to the 16th battalion of the Middlesex Regiment. This was a Public Schools Battalion, and was originally only open to those who had attended public schools. Lancaster's enlistment form shows "Dulwich" as a notation. However, Lancaster was discharged with three months on 2 March 1915 as "not likely to become an efficient soldier". This was a catch-all term that was used to get rid of recruits for a variety of reasons ranging from heart problems to alcoholism. Lancaster had numerous injuries from his time in Africa and one of these may have been at fault.

However, Lancaster persevered and was commissioned in the Royal Engineers as a Lieutenant on 25 May 1915. He was assigned to the 13th (Western) Division. The Dardanelles Committee meetings of 7 and 17 June 1915 assigned this division along with the 10th and 11th to the Gallipoli campaigns, trying to reverse the failure of the first landings to proceed beyond the beachheads. At Gallipoli, the distance from the front line to the beaches was only about five miles and the whole of the support area was subject to shellfire. A naval medical officer wrote "The nervous strain of being under shellfire day after day, week after week, and month after month might be expected to cause a large amount of mental depression and even insanity among the troops..."

The Gallipoli Campaigns petered out in early 1916, but Lancaster had ended his military service before this, resigning his commission with effect from 22 December 1915. As stated in an obituary, "his health became affected" during his war service.

On 28 August 1916, Lancaster was brought by the Police to Chelsea Workhouse for observation. Section 45 of the 1834 Poor Law effectively sanctioned the use of the workhouse as a holding centre between community and asylum. On 5 September 1916 Lancaster was discharged as insane from the Chelsea Workhouse to Colney Hatch Asylum,(Friern Hospital). His father later said that he spent four months in the Asylum in 1916.

By 1917 Lancaster had found employment with the Munitions Ministry. On 2 April Lancaster was found in the Great Western Railway station in Gloucester in unspecified "suspicious circumstances". He was found to be in possession of an out-of-date munitions pass, and was arrested. He was apparently under the impression that he was to conduct an inspection at a nearby munitions works. The court heard that Lancaster had shell shock, but also had later complications from a blow to the head. He was discharged into the care of a Ministry official who undertook to take him to London to be put in the care of his wife.

Lancaster's troubles did not end there. He was arrested again on 4 June 1917. This time he was charged with passing a fraudulent cheque and with obtaining narcotics by pretending to be a medical practitioner. The court was told that he had on 3 June presented a worthless cheque in payment of cocaine which the chemist had dispensed after Lancaster had stated that he was a Doctor Hamilton from Edinburgh. The Chemist checked the name and found it in the medical directory. However, he became suspicious and contacted the police. After initially claiming to be Hamilton, Lancaster admitted his real name and said that he had been taking a large quantity of cocaine.

At his next appearance in court the bank manager of the bank whose cheques had been used said that a clerk had issued the cheque book to Lancaster because she thought she recognised him as a customer. In his third and final court appearance, on 20 June 1917, Lancaster said that he had not known what he was doing. His father, Harry Collingwood, said that Lancaster was not responsible for what he did partly because of the effect of the cocaine, and partly because of shell shock. (Note: This would nowadays be regarded as a type of posttraumatic stress disorder) He stated the Lancaster had insomnia and took morphine and cocaine. Collingwood further stated that if Lancaster could be prevented from taking drugs he would recover his moral strength. The court said that it was difficult to know what to do, but bound over Lancaster to appear if called upon, and bound over Collingwood to produce him if required.

== Emigration to New Zealand ==
Lancaster's father died suddenly at his paternal aunts' house in Chester on 10 June 1922, leaving the relatively modest sum of £866 11s 8d to his widow. Lancaster's mother died in London on 18 April 1928, leaving £1,028 18s 7d to him.

Lancaster arrived with his wife in New Zealand on 16 May 1929 aboard the SD Ruapehu with the intention to settle in New Zealand. He initially worked on the South Island Main Trunk Railway extension between Wharanui and Parnassus. The work on this line had stopped during the First World War, and only began again in 1929, with some £43,000 spent in preliminary work in that year. However, financial pressures mounted and the Government stopped construction in 1931. Work on the line restarted in 1936 and it was officially opened on 15 December 1945.

With the end of work on the railway in 1931, Lancaster and his wife moved to the North Island and settled in Paihia where he went into business. In January 1934, Lancaster had a lucky escape while fishing at sea. His punt sprung a leak and was quickly swamped. Although a strong swimmer, he decided to stay with the swamped punt. The tide was running out, but a strong wind blowing on-shore led to his shouts being heard and he was rescued after two hours in the water. This was the second time he had nearly lost his life while fishing. He was swept over the bar of an East African river while fishing from a raft.

Lancaster was scoutmaster of the local scout troop, and the Lancasters built a hall both to serve the scouts and to act as a local cinema. Lancaster's wife kept in touch with her family. She was the beneficiary of her sister Augusta's will on her death on 20 January 1932. She was also the next-of-kin contact for her younger half-brother Alan Rice-Oxley when he was a civilian detainee of the Japanese during World War Two.

== Death ==
Lancaster died suddenly, aged 57, in New Zealand on 25 October 1937. His wife survived him for another 30 years, dying, aged 85, on 21 June 1967 in Auckland, New Zealand. They are both buried at Waikumete Cemetery in Auckland.
