= Roger Collingwood =

British mathematician

- Occupation: Mathematician

Roger Collingwood (fl. 1513) was a British mathematician.

== Biography ==
Collingwood was elected a fellow of Queens' College, Cambridge, in 1497, being then B.A., and proceeded M.A. two years later. He had the college title for orders on 7 August 1497, was dean of his college in 1504, and obtained a license on 16 September 1507 to travel on the continent during four years for the purpose of studying canon law. On the expiration of that term it was stipulated that he was to resign his fellowship, and his name, accordingly, disappears from the college books after 1509–10. He acted, however, as proctor of the university in 1513. Under the name of 'Carbo-in-ligno' Collingwood wrote an unfinished treatise entitled 'Arithmetica Experimentalis,' which he dedicated, in the character of a former pupil, to Richard Fox, bishop of Winchester. The manuscript is preserved in the library of Corpus Christi College, Oxford.
