= Collingwood Corner =

Community in Nova Scotia, Canada

Coordinates: 45°36′33.68″N 63°56′13.34″W

Collingwood Corner in Nova Scotia

Collingwood Corner is a community in the Canadian province of Nova Scotia, located in Cumberland County.
