= Collingwood station =

Collingwood station may refer to:

- Collingwood railway station, in Victoria, Australia
- Joyce–Collingwood station, a rapid transit station in Vancouver, Canada
- Collingwood Road tube station, a proposed rapid transit station in London, England
- Victoria Park railway station, Melbourne, the original station serving Collingwood, Victoria
