= Collinwood (disambiguation) =

Collinwood is the name of several places:

- Collinwood, a neighborhood of Cleveland, Ohio
- Welcome to Collinwood, a movie set in the Ohio neighborhood
- Collinwood, Tennessee
- Collinwood Township, Minnesota
- Collinwood Mansion, a fictional house in the television series Dark Shadows
