= Works by Harry Collingwood =

This page list the published work of Harry Collingwood, the pseudonym for William Joseph Cosens Lancaster. The 44 novels and the stories are organised by year of first publication, but the tables can be sorted interactively.

== Novels ==
List of Novels by Harry Collingwood
No	Year	Title	Pages	Initial UK Publisher	UK illustrator	Illustrations
1	1878	The Secret of the Sands	287+289	Griffith and Farran - London	Nil	
2	1884	The Pirate Island; a story of the South Pacific	339	Blackie and Son Limited	C. J. Staniland and J. R. Wells	8
2	1884	Under the Meteor Flag: Log of a Midshipman during the French Revolutionary War	326	Sampson Low, Marston & Co. Ltd.	M. L. P.	1
4	1885	The Voyage of the 'Aurora'	307	Sampson Low, Marston & Co. Ltd.		1, 6
5	1885	The Congo Rovers; a Story of the Slave Squadron	352	Blackie and Son Limited	Johann Schönberg	8 in Burt Ed.
6	1886	The Log of the Flying Fish; a story of Aerial and Submarine Peril and Adventure	384	Blackie and Son Limited	Gordon Browne	12
7	1887	The Rover's Secret; a tale of the Pirate Cays and Lagoons of Cuba	352	Blackie and Son Limited	William Christian Symons	3
8	1888	The Missing Merchantman	352	Blackie and Son Limited	W. H. Overend	4
9	1892	The Doctor of the 'Juliet'	360	Methuen	Gordon Browne	5
10	1894	The Cruise of the 'Esmeralda'	384	SPCK	W. H. Overend	4
11	1895	The Pirate Slaver; a story of the West African Coast	384	SPCK	W. H. Overend	
12	1896	Jack Beresford's Yarn	401	SPCK		
13	1896	The Log of a Privateersman	376	Blackie and Son Limited	William Rainey	12
14	1897	For Treasure Bound	395	Griffith Farran Browne & Co. Ltd	A front piece by Charles de Lacy?	1
15	1897	The Homeward Voyage	383	SPCK	W. H. Overend	4
16	1898	A Pirate of the Caribbees	343	Griffith Farran Browne & Co. Ltd	Charles de Lacy	
17	1898	An Ocean Chase	324	Blackie and Son Limited	J. B. Greene	
18	1899	The Castaways		Griffith Farran Browne & Co. Ltd	Percy F. S. Spence	
19	1906	Across the Spanish Main	351	Blackie and Son Limited	William Rainey	6
20	1906	Dick Leslie's Luck	383	SPCK	Harrold Piffard	
21	1907	Geoffrey Harrington's Adventures	511	SPCK	Harrold Piffard	6 col.
22	1907	With Airship and Submarine	376	Blackie and Son Limited	Edward S. Hodgson	
23	1908	Blue and Grey	317	Cassell & Co.	E. S. Hardy	
24	1908	A Middy in Command; a tale of the Slave Squadron	384	Blackie and Son Limited	Edward S. Hodgson	
25	1908	Under the Chilian Flag; a tale of war between Chili and Peru	280	Blackie and Son Limited	William Rainey	1
26	1909	Harry Escombe; a tale of adventure in Peru	303	Blackie and Son Limited	Victor Prout	
27	1909	The Cruise of the 'Thetis'; a tale of the Cuban Insurrection	367	Blackie and Son Limited	Cyrus Cuneo	4
28	1910	A Middy of the Slave Squadron	352	Blackie and Son Limited	William Rainey	
29	1910	Overdue; the story of a missing ship	287	Blackie and Son Limited	W. H. Holloway	
30	1911	A Middy of the King	368	Blackie and Son Limited	Edward S. Hodgson	
31	1911	The Adventures of Dick Maitland; a tale of unknown Africa	288	Blackie and Son Limited	Alec Ball	
32	1912	Two Gallant Sons of Devon	364	Blackie and Son Limited	Edward S. Hodgson	
33	1912	A Strange Cruise	296	Blackie and Son Limited	Archibald Webb	4
34	1913	Through Veld and Forest	351	Blackie and Son Limited	Archibald Webb	
35	1913	Turned Adrift	295	Blackie and Son Limited	Edward S. Hodgson	4
36	1914	The Cruise of the 'Nonsuch' Buccaneer	315	SPCK	John Williamson	
37	1914	The First Mate	288	Blackie and Son Limited	Edward S. Hodgson	
38	1914	A Chinese Command; a Story of Adventures in Eastern Seas	352	Blackie and Son Limited	Archibald Webb	
39	1915	In Search of El Dorado	312	Sampson Low, Marston & Co. Ltd.	Oscar Wilson	4
40	1916 (Note: No confirmation of publication date found in newspaper archives)	Under the Ensign of the Rising Sun	348	Sampson Low, Marston & Co. Ltd.	Savile Lumley	5
41	1922	The Strange Adventures of Eric Blackburn	317	Blackie and Son Limited	C. M. Padday	
42	1923	The Wreck of the Andromeda	288	Sampson Low, Marston & Co. Ltd.	L Parker	
43	1923 (Note: No confirmation of publication date found in newspaper archives)	The Cruise of the 'Flying Fish', the Airship-submarine	314	Sampson Low, Marston & Co. Ltd.	M. L. P.	2
44	1925 (Note: Published as a serial story in 1912.)	In the Power of the Enemy (published as serial in 1912)	282	Sampson Low, Marston & Co. Ltd.	M. L. P.	4

=== Sources ===
This list of novels above is based on a range of sources including the British Library Catalogue for the author, the Wikisource page for the author, Project Gutenberg, the Internet Archive, WorldCat, HathiTrust, Collingwood books available from the used books trade, and publishers catalogues and advertisements for the period. This list agrees with the list provided by Dizer, although he includes an omnibus edition as a separate work. Years of first publication were taken from the British Library, but not all the novels were catalogued at the British Library and even when they were, there were gaps in the information as they did not always indicate:

- The actual year of publication rather than the nominal one.
- The number of pages in the book
- Whether the book was illustrated or not
- The name of the illustrator, if any
- The number of illustrations, if any

As noted in G. A. Henty, it was common for some publishers, especially Blackie, to print not the year of publication, but the following one, so that they might look fresh for two Christmas buying seasons. This sometimes led to American editions having an earlier date than the UK edition as was the case for The Log of a Privateersman which has a date of 1896 for the Scribner edition in the US and 1897 for the Blackie edition in the UK. However, this book was published in 1896 in the UK also and was reviewed in The Scotsman (A tale palpitating with perilous adventure, fighting at sea, storms, wrecks, and multitudinous hazards.. . . ) in October and in St James Gazette (This is just the book to put into the hands of lads with a love for things nautical. . .) in November of that year. Except where noted in the list above, the actual year of publication has been confirmed by contemporary reviews in the year of publication.

Some of the information from sources such as WorldCat has been verified by examining scans of books and:

- Verifying the page count
- Verifying the number of illustrations (if not stated on the title page) . Note that the number of illustrations can vary by edition. In that case, two or more numbers may be given for the number of illustrations.
- Verifying the name of the illustrator from the illustrations is not printed on the title page

Location of cataloging data, texts, and scans of original books by Harry Collingwood.
No.	Year	Title	In British Library catalogue	British Library scan	Project Gutenberg text	Internet Archive text	Internet Archive scan	HathiTrust scan
1	1878	The Secret of the Sands	Yes	Yes	Yes	Yes	Yes	Yes
2	1884	The Pirate Island	Yes	No	Yes	Yes	Yes	Yes
3	1884	Under the Meteor Flag	Yes	No	Yes	Yes	Yes	No
4	1885	The Voyage of the 'Aurora'	Yes	No	Yes	Yes	Yes	No
5	1885	The Congo Rovers	Yes	No	Yes	Yes	Yes	Yes
6	1886	The Log of the Flying Fish	Yes	No	Yes	Yes	Yes	Yes
7	1887	The Rover's Secret	Yes	No	Yes	Yes	Yes	No
8	1888	The Missing Merchantman	Yes	No	Yes	Yes	Yes	No
9	1892	The Doctor of the 'Juliet'	Yes	Yes	No	Yes	No	Yes
10	1894	The Cruise of the 'Esmeralda'	No	No	Yes	Yes	Yes	No
11	1895	The Pirate Slaver	Yes	No	Yes	Yes	Yes	No
12	1896	Jack Beresford's Yarn (Note: The British Library Catalogue notes that their copy of the book was destroyed in the Second World War.)	Yes	No	No	No	No	No
13	1896	The Log of a Privateersman	Yes	No	Yes	Yes	Yes	Yes
14	1897	For Treasure Bound	Yes	No	Yes	Yes	Yes	No
15	1897	The Homeward Voyage	Yes	No	No	No	No	No
16	1898	A Pirate of the Caribbees	Yes	No	Yes	Yes	Yes	No
17	1898	An Ocean Chase	Yes	No	No	Yes	Yes	No
18	1899	The Castaways	Yes	No	Yes	No	No	Yes
19	1906	Across the Spanish Main	Yes	No	Yes	Yes	Yes	No
20	1906	Dick Leslie's Luck	Yes	No	Yes	No	No	No
21	1907	Geoffrey Harrington's Adventures	Yes	No	No	Yes	Yes	No
22	1907	With Airship and Submarine	Yes	No	Yes	Yes	Yes	No
23	1908	Blue and Grey	Yes	No	No	No	No	No
24	1908	A Middy in Command	Yes	No	Yes	Yes	Yes	No
25	1908	Under the Chilian Flag	Yes	No	Yes	Yes	Yes	Yes
26	1909	Harry Escombe	Yes	No	Yes	Yes	Yes	No
27	1909	The Cruise of the 'Thetis'	Yes	No	Yes	Yes	Yes	No
28	1910	A Middy of the Slave Squadron	Yes	No	Yes	Yes	Yes	No
29	1910	Overdue	Yes	No	Yes	Yes	Yes	No
30	1911	A Middy of the King	Yes	No	Yes	Yes	Yes	No
31	1911	The Adventures of Dick Maitland	Yes	No	Yes	Yes	Yes	No
32	1912	Two Gallant Sons of Devon	Yes	No	Yes	Yes	Yes	No
33	1912	A Strange Cruise	Yes	No	No	Yes	Yes	No
34	1913	Through Veld and Forest	Yes	No	Yes	Yes	Yes	No
35	1913	Turned Adrift	Yes	No	Yes	Yes	Yes	No
36	1914	The Cruise of the 'Nonsuch' Buccaneer	Yes	No	Yes	Yes	Yes	No
37	1914	The First Mate	Yes	No	Yes	Yes	Yes	No
38	1914	A Chinese Command	Yes	No	Yes	Yes	Yes	No
39	1915	In Search of El Dorado	Yes	No	Yes	Yes	Yes	No
40	1916	Under the Ensign of the Rising Sun	Yes	No	Yes	No	No	No
41	1922	The Strange Adventures of Eric Blackburn	Yes	No	Yes	Yes	Yes	No
42	1923	The Wreck of the Andromeda	Yes	No	No	Yes	Yes	No
43	1923	The Cruise of the 'Flying Fish', the Airship-submarine	Yes	No	No	Yes	Yes	No
44	1925	In the Power of the Enemy	Yes	No	No	Yes	Yes	No

=== American Publishers ===
In some cases, as with Griffith & Farran and SPCK, the UK publishers seem to have distributed the books under their own imprint in the United States through an agent. E. P. Dutton acted for Griffith & Farran. SPCK worked through E. and J. B. Young initially, and later through E.S. Gorham. The books published by Blackie in the UK were often published by Scribner and Welford in the US. This firm was set up by Charles Scribner and Charles Welford specifically to import or reprint foreign books (almost entirely from England), and were the largest such firm in the US. In January 1891, Scribner & Welford was subsumed under Charles Scribner's Sons which then took over publishing the Collingwood Blackie novels in the US. Other publishers were also involved in publishing Collingwood's work in the US, particularly A. L. Burt who produced cheap editions sometimes with fewer illustrations. Piracy was also a problem in the US market. Dizer states that of the five copies of The Congo Rovers he holds, three are pirate editions. Given the mix of importation, local publishing, and piracy, it is difficult to build a definitive list of us editions.

=== Piracy in the UK ===
The following apology appeared in September 1910 in book trade publications: Messrs. James Henderson and Sons, Ltd., of Red Lion House, Red Lion Court, Fleet Street, London, E.C., beg to apologise to Messrs. Blackie & Son, Ltd., Publishers, of London and Glasgow, for having unwittingly published a story named "The Cruise of the Flying-Fish," by "Colin Dawson," the same having been copied by its ostensible author from the "Log of the Flying-Fish," written by Harry Collingwood, and being a grave infringement of Messrs. Blackie & Son, Ltd., copyright in that work. Messrs. James Henderson & Sons, Ltd., deeply regret the circumstances and have caused the infringing work to be withdrawn from circulation.

=== Potential additional works ===
The Oxford Dictionary of National Biography states that Lancaster wrote more than fifty books for boys, Current listings of Titles by Harry Collingwood on the British Library, Project Gutenberg, the Internet Archive, Abe Books (a rare books retailing service), the list provided by Dizer, and Wikisource list only 44 in total, and two of these are nearly identical, with To Treasure Bound being an slightly edited reissue of The Secret of the Sands. Additional potential titles are:

- In the Grip of Anarchists listed as one of Collingwood's books in the entry for him in Who's Who in Children's Literature. An advertisement for Chums in May 1896 states that the new issue begins a serial story by Harry Collingwood with this name. No record of a book with such a title was found. However, the title would be an accurate description of the plot of "Overdue" (1910).
- The Adventures of Lieut Courtenay R.N is advertised as being by Harry Collingwood in a 1898 catalogue from Griffiths Farran, Browne & Co Ltd. However, Lieut Courtenay was the hero of A Pirate of the Caribbees (1898) published by Griffith Farran, Browne.
- Missing: A Tale of the Merchant Marine by Harry Collingwood, is listed in a notice from Blackie & Son in the Academy in September 1888. The same title was announced in The Publishers Weekly by Scribner & Welford in the same month. However the description of this title from a catalogue attached to one of their books is exactly the same as for The Missing Merchant Man in a catalogue in the following year. Newbolt explains that Missing: A Tale of the Merchant Service seems to have been a provisional title used before publication.

Some titles are known by more than one name. For example, In Search of El Dorado (1915) is sometimes knows as A pair of Adventurers in Search of El Dorado. Under the Ensign of the Rising Sun (1916) is also known as Under a Foreign Flag. There is also room for confusion among the titles. The First Mate (1914) is subtitled The Story of A Strange Cruise but this should not be confused with A Strange Cruise (1912). There is also at least one omnibus volume containing With Airship and Submarine (1908), Two Gallant Sons of Devon (1913), and A Chinese Command (1915).

=== Misattributed work ===
Leisure Lyrics by a busy man by William John Lancaster is frequently misattributed to WJC Lancaster. However, a quick perusal of the text shows that the author of Leisure Lyrics used the initials WJL, was a long-time employee of the Prudential Assurance Company, (Note: There are many references in Leisure Lyrice to the Ibis Magazine. This was the house journal of the Prudential Assurance Company, and featured contributions by staff members.) had several children, and lived in Putney. These facts fit William John Lancaster rather than WJC Lancaster.

=== Re-issued work ===
Many of Lancaster's novels were reprinted multiple times. The WorldCat page for The Pirate Island lists 26 different print editions for that title held by libraries, one of the most popular of his novels. This does not mean that there are 26 different print editions held by libraries as data entry errors can read to duplicated entries for the same text. However, there are at least 16 distinct editions listed. WorldCat libraries hold editions issued by Blackie of London in 1885, 1893, 1902, 1905, 1923, and 1934 (in which year there were two editions with different illustrators, presumably a cheaper black and white edition and a more expensive colour one). The British Library holds three of these Blackie editions. WorldCat aggregates the holdings of libraries, so it is perfectly possible that there were other editions that are not currently held in libraries, either not having been purchased by them, or having been lost or disposed of in the last hundred and thirty years. The WorldCat page for The Rover's Secret shows 20 print editions for that title.

Normally the reprinted books bore the same title as the original and had a completely identical text. For Treasure Bound (1897) is an exception to this rule. It is a single volume re-issue of “The Secret of the Sands or the ‘Water Lily’ and her crew” (1879), the first book by Lancaster. The 1879 edition, published by Griffith and Farran, was in two volumes. Most of the chapters in For Treasure Bound are the same as in The Secret of the Sands, word for word. Most of the changes are in the restructuring and tightening of Chapter Three. One change throughout the book is the replacement of "etc." with "etcetera". The subtitle for Chapter 12 (Chapter 2 of Volume 2 in the original) was changed from A Miracle to A Mirage. Other than this, the two books have the same plot, characters, dialogue, incidents etc.

Demonstrating the complexity of the multiple editions, The Secret of the Sands was also issued as a New Edition in a single volume by Griffith, Farran, Okeden, & Welsh in 1888, but seems to have exactly the same text as the 1879 edition. For Treasure Bound was reissued in 1910 as a New Edition with illustrations in colour by no less an artist than Walter Ernest Webster. Neither the 1879 nor the 1888 editions of The Secret of the Sands had any illustrations. The 1888 edition of For Treasure Bound had a frontispiece, and the 1910 edition had four colour plates and a full colour inset in the front cover.

== Themes in the novels ==
The Robinsonade, the castaway or desert island genre of fiction influence by Robinson Crusoe, developed rapidly as part of the mid-Victorian writing boom. Boehmer states that Motifs of shipwreck, resourceful settlement and cultivation, treasure, slaves and the fear of cannibalism resurfaced time and again in boy's stories. Baker and Womak note that other Victorian writers such as Marryat, Ballantyne, and W. G. Kingston also presented the protagonists of their novels with challenges such as surviving shipwreck, fighting with savages or pirates. Collingwood's plots include not only these elements of the Robinsonade, but also his own hobbies, such as sailing and yacht-design, in the novels. Note that grey cells in the following table mean that no copy of the book is to hand to check the plot, and the plot items listed are related in reviews of the book in question.

Plot element in Novels by Harry Collingwood
No.	Year	Title	Sailing ships	Pirates	Hurricane	Shipwreck	Gold	Attacked by natives	Sea Rescue	Shipboard Fire	Open-boat/raft voyage	Sea battle	Steam ships	Slavery	Ship design/building	Mutiny	Pearls	Deserted Island	Buried treasure	Threat of parental ruin
1	1878	The Secret of the Sands	Yes	Yes	Yes	No	Yes	Yes	Yes	Yes/No	No	No	No	No	Yes	Yes	Yes	No	Yes	No
2	1884	The Pirate Island	Yes	Yes	Yes	Yes	Yes	No	Yes	Yes	Yes	No	No	No	Yes	No	No	No	No	No
3	1884	Under the Meteor Flag	Yes	Yes	No	No	No	No	No	Yes	Yes	Yes	No	No	No	No	No	No	No	No
4	1885	The Voyage of the 'Aurora'	Yes	Yes	Yes	Yes	No	No	No	Yes	No	Yes	No	Yes	No	Yes	No	No	No	No
5	1885	The Congo Rovers	Yes	Yes	Yes	No	No	Yes	No	Yes	Yes	Yes	No	Yes	No	No	No	No	No	No
6	1886	The Log of the Flying Fish	No	Yes	Yes	Yes	No	No	Yes	Yes	No	No	Yes	No	No	No	No	No	No	No
7	1887	The Rover's Secret	Yes	Yes	Yes	Yes	No	No	Yes	No	No	Yes	No	Yes	No	Yes	No	No	No	No
8	1888	The Missing Merchantman	Yes	Yes	Yes	Yes	Yes	No	No	No	No	No	No	No	Yes	Yes	Yes	Yes	No	No
9	1892	The Doctor of the 'Juliet'	Yes	Yes	Yes	Yes	Yes	No	Yes	Yes	Yes	No	Yes	No	Yes	Yes	Yes	Yes	No	Yes
10	1894	The Cruise of the 'Esmeralda'	Yes	Yes	Yes	Yes	Yes	Yes	No	No	No	No	No	Yes	No	No	No	No	Yes	Yes
11	1895	The Pirate Slaver	Yes	Yes	Yes	Yes	No	Yes	No	No	No	No	No	No	No	No	No	No	No	No
12	1896	Jack Beresford's Yarn	Yes	Yes											Yes	Yes		Yes		
13	1896	The Log of a Privateersman	Yes	Yes	Yes	Yes	Yes	No	Yes	Yes	Yes	Yes	No	Yes	No	No	No	No	No	No
14	1897	For Treasure Bound	Yes	Yes	Yes	No	Yes	Yes	Yes	Yes/No	No	No	No	No	Yes	Yes	Yes	No	Yes	No
15	1897	The Homeward Voyage	Yes	Yes			Yes									Yes		Yes	Yes	No
16	1898	A Pirate of the Caribbees	Yes	Yes	Yes	Yes	No	No	Yes	Yes	Yes	Yes	No	Yes	No	No	No	No	No	No
17	1898	An Ocean Chase	Yes	Yes	Yes	Yes	No	Yes	Yes	No	No	No	No	No	No	No	No	No	No	No
18	1899	The Castaways	Yes	Yes	No	Yes	No	No	No	Yes	Yes	No	No	Yes/No	No	No	No	Yes	Yes	No
19	1906	Across the Spanish Main	Yes	Yes	Yes	Yes	Yes	Yes	No	Yes	No	Yes	No	Yes	No	Yes	Yes	Yes	No	No
20	1906	Dick Leslie's Luck	Yes	No	Yes	Yes	Yes	No	Yes	Yes	Yes	No	Yes	No	Yes	Yes	Yes/No	Yes	No	No
21	1907	Geoffrey Harrington's Adventures	Yes	No	Yes	Yes	No	Yes/No	No	Yes/No	No	Yes	Yes	Yes/No	Yes	No	No	No	No	No
22	1907	With Airship and Submarine	No	Yes	Yes	Yes	Yes	No	No	No	No	Yes	Yes	No	No	No	Yes	No	No	No
23	1908	Blue and Grey	Yes									Yes	Yes	Yes						
24	1908	A Middy in Command	Yes	Yes	Yes	Yes	Yes	Yes	No	No	Yes	Yes	No	Yes	No	Yes	No	No	No	No
25	1908	Under the Chilian Flag	No	No	No	Yes	Yes	No	Yes	Yes	No	No	Yes	No	No	No	No	No	Yes	No
26	1909	Harry Escombe	Yes	No	No	Yes	Yes	No	No	No	No	No	Yes	No	No	No	No	No	No	No
27	1909	The Cruise of the 'Thetis'	Yes	No	No	No	No	No	No	No	No	No	Yes	No	No	No	No	No	No	No
28	1910	A Middy of the Slave Squadron	Yes	Yes	Yes	No	No	Yes	No	No	No	No	No	Yes	No	No	No	No	No	No
29	1910	Overdue	Yes	Yes	No	Yes	No	No	Yes	Yes	No	No	No	No	No	No	Yes	Yes	No	No
30	1911	A Middy of the King	Yes	Yes	Yes	Yes	No	No	No	No	Yes	No	No	No	No	No	No	No	No	No
31	1911	The Adventures of Dick Maitland	Yes	No	No	No	Yes	Yes	No	No	No	No	No	No	No	No	No	No	No	Yes
32	1912	Two Gallant Sons of Devon	Yes	Yes/No	No	No	Yes	Yes	Yes	Yes	No	Yes	No	No	No	No	Yes	No	No	No
33	1912	A Strange Cruise	Yes	Yes	No	No	Yes	No	No	No	No	No	Yes	No	Yes	No	No	No	No	Yes
34	1913	Through Veld and Forest	No	No	No	No	Yes	Yes	No	No	No	No	No	Yes	No	No	No	No	No	Yes/No
35	1913	Turned Adrift	Yes	Yes	Yes	Yes	Yes	Yes	No	No	Yes	No	No	No	Yes	Yes	Yes	Yes	No	No
36	1914	The Cruise of the 'Nonsuch' Buccaneer	Yes	Yes/No	Yes	Yes	Yes	Yes	No	No	No	Yes	No	Yes	Yes	No	Yes	No	No	No
37	1914	The First Mate	Yes	Yes	Yes	No	No	Yes	No	No	Yes	No	No	No	No	No	No	Yes	No	No
38	1914	A Chinese Command	No	Yes	Yes	Yes	Yes	Yes	No	No	No	No	Yes	No	No	Yes	No	No	Yes	No
39	1915	In Search of El Dorado	Yes	No	No	Yes	Yes	No	Yes	No	No	No	Yes	No	No	No	No	No	No	No
40	1916	Under the Ensign of the Rising Sun	No	Yes	No	Yes	No	No	Yes	Yes	No	Yes	Yes	No	No	No	No	No	No	No
41	1922	The Strange Adventures of Eric Blackburn	Yes	No	Yes	Yes	Yes	No	Yes	No	Yes	Yes	Yes	No	Yes	No	No	Yes	No	No
42	1923	The Wreck of the Andromeda	Yes	No	Yes	No	No	Yes/No	No	No	Yes	No	Yes	No	Yes	No	No	Yes/No	No	No
43	1923	The Cruise of the 'Flying Fish', the Airship-submarine	No	No	No	No	No	No	No	No	No	No	No	No	No	No	No	No	No	No
44	1925	In the Power of the Enemy	No	No	No	No	Yes	Yes	No	No	No	No	No	Yes/No	No	No	No	No	No	No

== Short Works ==
Shorter work written by Harry Collingwood.
Year	Title	Type	Journal or Book	Date	Start p.	Pages	Illustrator
1880	A Perilous Climb; The Lightkeeper's Story	Short Story	Union Jack 1:13	1880-03-25	198	3	H. Petherick
1880	The Diver's Story; A Thrilling Narrative of Adventure in the Indian Seas	Serial Pt.1	Union Jack 1:15	1880-04-08	228	4	H. Petherick
1880	The Diver's Story; A Thrilling Narrative of Adventure in the Indian Seas	Serial Pt.2	Union Jack 1:17	1880-04-22	263	2	
1880	Boat-Building and Boat-Sailing	Column	Union Jack 1:29	1880-07-15	461	3	
1880	Boat-Building and Boat-Sailing	Column	Union Jack 1:34	1880-08-19	539	6	
1880	Boat-Building and Boat-Sailing	Column	Union Jack 1:39	1880-09-23	621	3	
1880	Boat-Building and Boat-Sailing	Column	Union Jack 2:43	1880-10-21	47	2	
1880	Boat-Building and Boat-Sailing	Column	Union Jack 2:46	1880-11-11	95	2	
1880	Boat-Building and Boat-Sailing	Column	Union Jack 2:50	1880-12-09	159	2	
1881	Boat-Building and Boat-Sailing	Column	Union Jack 2:55	1881-01-13	239	1	
1881	Boat-Building and Boat-Sailing	Column	Union Jack 2:59	1881-02-15	303	1	
1881	Boat-Building and Boat-Sailing	Column	Union Jack 2:63	1881-03-10	366	3	
1881	An Eventful Ride	Serial Pt.1	Union Jack 2:83	1881-07-28	677	4	H. Petherick
1881	An Eventful Ride	Serial Pt.1	Union Jack 2:84	1881-08-04	693	4	H. Petherick
1882	The Phantom Pilot: A Christmas Story	Short Story	Old England's Flag 1882 (Note: Old England's Flag was the name give to the Christmas Issue of the Union Jack. The name was different because while the Union Jack normally cost one penny, the Old England's Flag cost six pence.)	1882-11			John Jellico
1896	Unknown title (Note: This may refer to In the Hands of the Anarchists which was serialised in Chums in 1896.)	Said to be Serial	Chums Yearly Volume for 1896	1896			
1898	The Slavers Revenge	Short Story	Yule Logs, Being Longmans's Xmas Annual for 1898 edited by G.A. Henty, Longman, London	1898	344	39	Trevor Haddon
1899	Samana Key	Short Story	Yule-Tide Yarns, ed by G.A. Henty, published by Longmans, London	1899	268	28	Lancelot Speed
1918	Peril and Pluck on the Grand Banks	Short Story	Chums 26:1325	1918-02-02	257	2	W. G. Whitaker

=== Sources ===
The list of short works by Harry Collingwood is largely based on the British Juvenile Story Papers and Pocket Libraries Index run by Steve Holland. Indexing of British boys' magazines and story papers is ongoing. As Collingwood contributed to both The Union Jack and to Chums he may have written for other such outlets. It is possible that there may be many more short works by Harry Collingwood than those given in the table above.
