= Little Folks (British magazine) =

British children's magazine

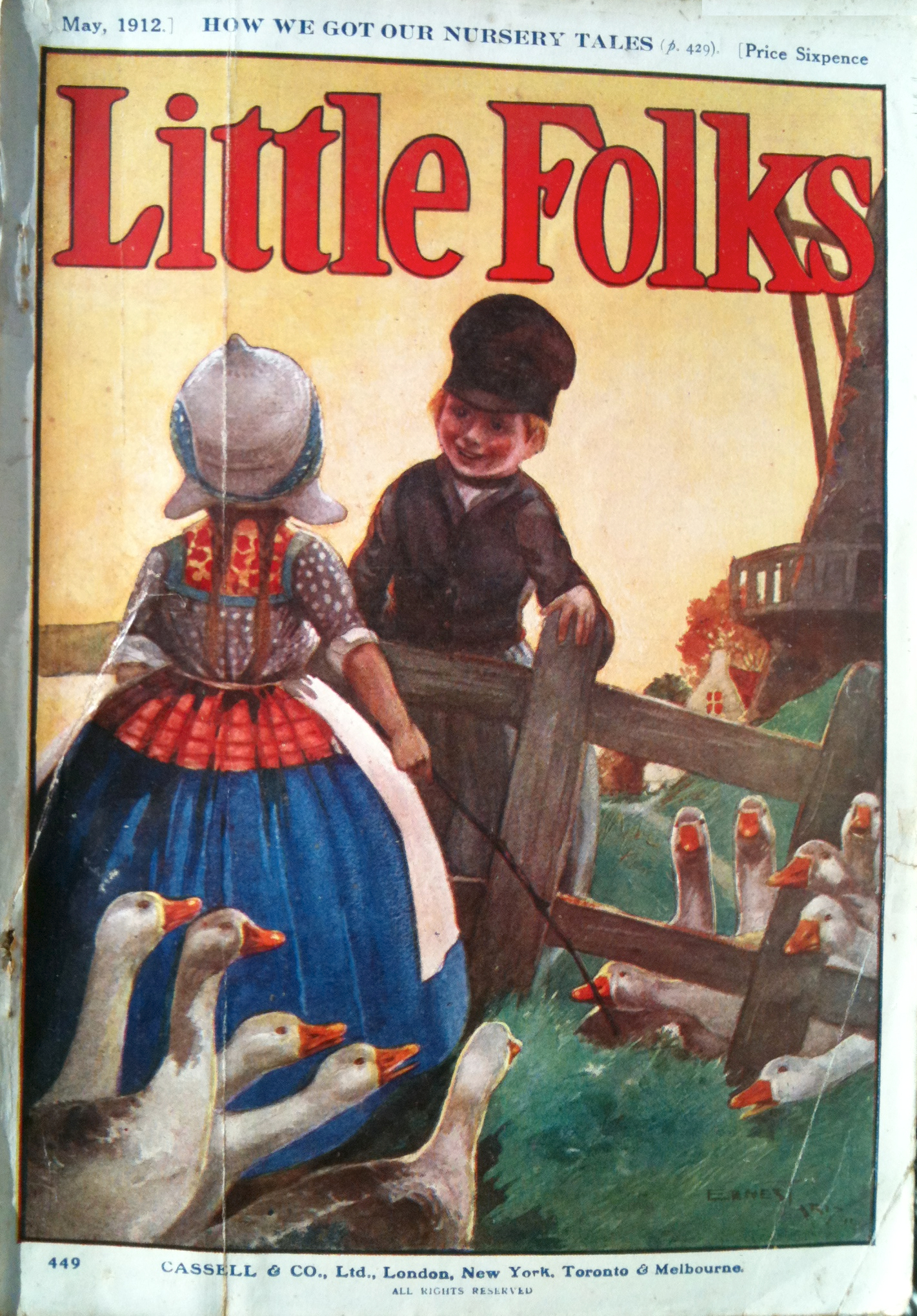
- May 1912 cover
- Frequency: Monthly
- First issue: 1871; 155 years ago
- Final issue: 1933
- Country: United Kingdom
- Based in: London
- Language: English

Little Folks was a British children's magazine published monthly by Cassell & Company from 1871 until 1933. The magazine published stories by well-known authors including Sarah Pitt, Bernard Heldmann, and Bella Sidney Woolf. Illustrators included Edward S. Hodgson, Kate Greenaway and Harry Rountree.

Sam Hield Hamer was editor for a twelve year period between 1895-1907. Herbert Williams was editor for an unknown period, including from 1920 to 1927.

== Content ==
The well-illustrated magazine contained serial stories, short stories about history and adventure, poetry, puzzle games, and letters from readers.

In 1872 the magazine published biographies of Wolfgang Amadeus Mozart and John Bunyan. There was a column entitled Music Made Easy for Little Folks, plus Bible lessons, and stories on children from other lands.

In 1915 regular columns included Pages for Hobbies, Little Folks Library Club, Little Folks Science Club – conducted by "Sparks", and Little Folks Nature Club – by "Kingfisher". (In 1919 "Squirrel" conducted the nature column.) The later column held competitions for drawings and prose on nature subjects.

The November 1926 issue contained the opening installment of a new school serial by Dorothy Moore, plus a boys’ adventure story entitled “Pirate Gold” by Peter Martin. Prizes were offered for readers’ submissions in the Competition Corner section.

== Readers' charitable giving ==
On different occasions readers were asked to send in donations for those in need. In the June 1875 issue prizes were offered for dolls with the best sets of clothes, with the understanding that that the dolls and clothing would be given to sick children in London hospitals. Over 500 clothed dolls were donated.

In 1898 the Queen Victoria Drinking Fountain was erected in Glasgow, Scotland by the readers of Little Folks to provide drinking water for working class families.

In 1908 Bella Sidney Woolf appealed to Little Folks readers for funds to buy additional beds or cots for the Queen's Hospital for Children. The response was great enough to pay for a new ward for the hospital. In 1914 Woolf once again appealed to Little Folks readers to give money for the Prince Of Wales' National Relief Fund, to help families of soldiers who had gone to war.

== Little Folks' readers ==
Gretchen R. Galbraith has researched the magazine's readers' participation in contests and letter-writing, and stated "Girls outnumbered boys in every category of participation, and they tended to read the magazine for more years." Galbraith concluded that "Correspondents' postal addresses and descriptions of their travels, nannies, and nurseries indicate a middle- and upper-class readership." She hypothesized that "The magazine appears to have been especially popular in clergymen's families."

== Other Little Folks publications ==
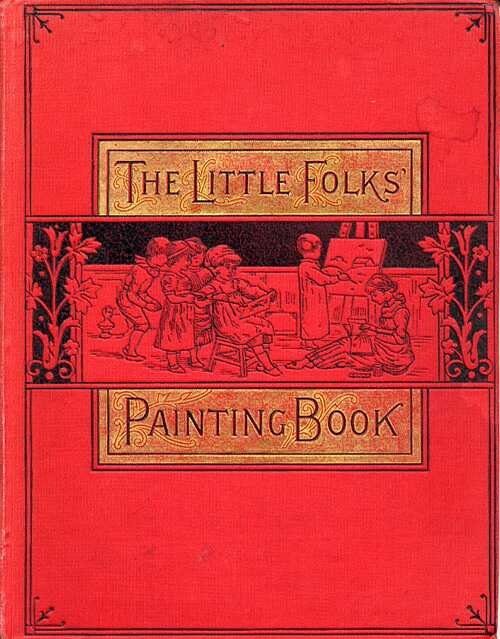

From at least 1879 to 1894 editions of The Little Folks Painting Book were published, containing black and white illustrations for children to colour. In 1880 it was reported that the editor of Little Folks donated 4,000 copies of the Little Folks Painting Book to children's hospitals throughout the country.

Yearly editions of the Little Folks Annual were published from at least 1879 to 1915, promoted as to be given as Christmas gifts.

== Other Little Folks periodicals ==
- Little Folks was a monthly United States children's magazine for young readers that was published by Samuel E. Cassino from 1897 to 1926.
- Edward Eggleston published an eight-page Sunday School paper entitled Little Folks, which was distributed monthly within the United States, and was published from 1869 to 1877.
