= Edward S. Hodgson =

Scottish artist

- Born: 25 April 1866; Arbroath, Angus, Scotland
- Died: 15 April 1937 (aged 70); Watford Peace Memorial Hospital, Hertfordshire, England
- Occupations: Artist and Illustrator
- Years active: 1886–1925 (Note: Houfe states that Hodgson was active from 1908 to 1925.Peppin and Micklethwait say that he was active from 1908 to 1936. However, he was already exhibiting from 1886.)
- Known for: Illustrating 17 books by Percy F. Westerman

Edward S. Hodgson (25 April 1866 – 15 April 1937) was a Scottish artist, etcher, and illustrator who began a career on the sea, but after an injury, switched to art. He is probably best known as the illustrator of 17 boys' adventure books by Percy F. Westerman.

== Biography ==
Edward was born in the afternoon of 25 April 1866 at Arbroath, Angus, Scotland. (Note: Angus was known officially as Forfarshire until May 1928.) His father Alfred (c. 1852 – 1881), a machinist from Bordeaux France was then employed as a railway mechanic. His mother was Jessie Hanton Dryden (born c. 1833).

Hodgson began his career as a sailor, but owing to an accident to his leg, he was forced to give up the sea. As he had a flair for painting, he took up art and was trained by W. M. Grubb at the High School of Dundee.

Hodgson married Mary Wilson Crowe (14 Feb 1871 – 16 February 1945) in St Peter's Parish, Dundee, on 4 June 1894, and the marriage was registered the following day. Mary was the daughter of David Crowe, a wine and spirit merchant. The couple had at least three children:

- David Crowe Hodgson (16 August 1895 – 21 July 1937) (Note: David made a name for himself as a singer.)
- Ronald Hodgson (born 27 February 1899)
- George Dryden Hodgson (17 May 1902 – 20 November 1955)

Hodgson moved to England in 1894, settling at Bushey, Hertfordshire. His address in the 1911 census was St. Ninians, Finch Lane, Bushey. He was still at that address when he died in 1937, as was his wife when she died in 1945.

Hodgson continued to work until almost the end of his life. He died on Thursday 15 April 1937 at Watford Peace Memorial Hospital. He was cremated at Golders Green Crematorium on Saturday, 24 April 1937. (Note: Kirkpatrick gives the date of cremation as 23 April 1937.) Mary was staying at Shepherds' Hotel in Deal, Kent on 29 September 1939, at the time of the 1939 Register. She was still living at home in Finch Lane when she died on 26 February 1945 at 60 Vicarage Road, at the home of her widowed daughter-in-law. Her estate was valued at £8,465 9s. 2d.

== Career ==
After abandoning his maritime career he studied art. However, ships and the sea were a constant feature of his output, especially as an illustrator. He was successful at the Dundee School of Art and was awarded the grade "good with a certificate" for both freehand drawing and practical geometry in the Second Grade exams 1884. (Note: The School of Art was based at the High School of Dundee and the YMCA and provided evening classes in Art to meet the requirements of the examinations of the Department of Science and Art in South Kensington.) The following year he was awarded a first class art teachers certificate in Practical Plane and solid geometry, and a second class certificate in Building Construction, Elementary Stage, as well as a teachers certificate in drawing and shading groups of models in the Third Class exams at the Dundee School of Art. He used his certificate and taught art in several private schools in the district.

He established a studio in Reform Street, Dundee. He was a frequent exhibitor in Dundee, mainly of landscapes and seascapes. He exhibited The Lass that Baits the Line at the Dundee Fine Art Exhibition in 1886, and it was adjudged to be "a small but promising work in its execution." He showed a "beautiful watercolour of Dundee" and three "very clever" oil paintings at the Annual Exhibition of the Dundee Art Club in 1888. Hodgson was elected vice president of the newly formed "Graphic Arts Association" in January 1890, and was re-elected at the end of the year. He exhibited one work at the 1890 Dundee Fine Art Exhibition and five at the same venue in 1891. The Dundee Directory of 1890-91 gave Hodgson as the Vice President of the Dundee Graphics Arts Association, and living at Baldovan Villa, Baldovan, Dundee.

Hodgson was not only a painter an illustrator, but also an etcher. He produced prints of two etchings in 1891 which were said to be "extremely pleasing both in conception and execution" and showed his "attainment of very creditable mastery of the technique of the etcher's art." In that year also he produced a portfolio of six etchings of scenes in Dundee, (Note: The scenes were the High Street, the Old Steeple, the Royal Exchange, part of Hilltown, the Custom House, and the Dock House. The artists proofs of the etchings, signed by Hodgson, were offered for sale in 1926 for 12s 6d. (£0.625) each unframed.) which were said to be "graceful transcripts of local scenery". In the following year, his etching of Dundee from the River was accepted by Queen Victoria, whose private secretary thanked Hodgson for his "finely executed etching." The etching had been published by Liddle of Dundee. In 1894 Hodson had "a beautiful etching" of Fettes College, Edinburgh published by print makers Dickinson and Foster of Bond Street in London.

In 1894 Hodgson moved to Bushey, Hertfordshire to study under Hubert von Herkomer at the art school he had established there in 1883. When he exhibited a landscape By Mead and Stream at the Dundee Find Art Exhibition in the following year the Dundee Advertiser said that the landscape showed "how much he had profited by his studies under Herkomer."

== Magazine illustration ==
By 1900 he was illustrating for magazines, and his work eventually appeared in, among others:

- The Captain
- Cassell's Family Magazine
- Chums
- The Girl's Realm
- The Graphic
- The Illustrated London News
- Little Folks
- The Pall Mall Magazine
- Pearson's Magazine
- The Quiver
- The Royal Magazine
- The Sphere
- The Strand Magazine
- The Wide World Magazine
- The Windsor Magazine
- The Sketch

During the First World War Hodgson worked for the Graphic, mainly producing pen and ink illustrations of the war at sea.

== Book illustration ==
In 1896, Hodgson illustrated a reissue of Victor Hugo's The Toilers of the Sea. In 1907 he illustrated The Pearl Seekers by Alexander Macdonald FRGS with "some splendid illustrations".

Among the writers whose work Hodgson illustrated were: (Note: The list of authors is based on the list of books illustrated by Hodgson from Kirkpatrick.)

- R. M. Ballantyne (1825–1894), a prolific Scottish author of juvenile fiction and an accomplished water-colourist.
- John Barrow (1808–1898), the second son of Sir John Barrow, he was head of the Admiralty Records Office, who wrote and edited travelogues.
- John Joy Bell (1871–1934), a prolific Scottish writer and journalist, best remembered for his comic fictional creation, Wee Macgreegor.
- F. S. Brereton (1872–1957), who wrote tales of Imperial heroism for children.
- Harry Collingwood (1843–1922), a writer of boys' adventure fiction, usually in a nautical setting.
- Herbert Eastwick Compton (1853–1906), an English novelist, biographer, world traveller, and writer on miscellaneous topics.
- James Fenimore Cooper (1789–1851), who created a unique form of American literature with his historical fiction with frontier and Native American themes.
- E. E. Cowper (c. 1859–1933), Edith Eliza Cowper, a prolific English author of adventure stories for girls, much of which was published by the SPCK, who had eight children by Frank Cowper, yachtsman and author, from whom she separated shortly after the last of her children was born.
- Bernard Heldmann (1857–1915), a prolific author who published 76 novels and hundreds of short stories.
- Victor Hugo (1802–1885), A French poet, dramatist, and novelist, who is now best remembered for Les Misérables, (1862) and The Hunchback of Notre-Dame (1831)
- T. T. Jeans (1871–1938), a Royal Navy medical officer who wrote juvenile fiction to show boys what life in the modern navy was really like. (Note: The T. T. Jeans page has an example of a set of illustrations by Hodgson for Jeans' Mr. Midshipman Glover, R.N. A tale of the Royal Navy of to-day (Blackie & Son, London, 1908.))
- W. H. G. Kingston (1814–1880), who wrote boy's adventure fiction.
- Alexander Macdonald (1878–1939), FRGS, an explorer, miner, film maker, and author of boys' adventure stories.
- Frederick Marryat (1792–1848), a Royal Navy officer who wrote adventure books for children.
- L. T. Meade (1844–1914), Elizabeth Thomasina Meade Smith, a prolific Irish writer of stories for girls.
- Frank Hubert Shaw (1878–1960), a Royal Navy officer who saw service in World War One and a prolific author who wrote some seventy books and estimated 7,000 boys' magazine stories writing as Frank H. Shaw, Frank Cleveland, Archibald Guthrie, Grenville Hammerton, Frank Hubert, and Ernest Winchfield.
- Dorothy à Beckett Terrell (1879–1949), a writer of five romantic novels for young women, one of which Sister-in-Chief (Cassell, London, 1912) won a £250 prize for girl's stories.
- Jules Verne (1828–1905), the French novelist poet and playwright, sometimes called the "Father of Science Fiction".
- Percy Westerman (1875–1959), a prolific author of boys' adventure fiction, many with military and naval themes. Hodgson illustrated seventeen books by Percy F. Westerman.

=== Illustrations for books by Percy F. Westerman ===
Three of the sets of illustrations by Hodgson for books by Westerman are shown below. (Note: Two more sets of illustration of Westerman's books by Hodgson can be found on Percy Westerman's page.)

In 1916 Hodgson illustrated Rounding up the Raider (Blackie and Son, London) by Westerman. In this story, three Royal Navy sub-lieutenants are travelling home from the Far East by a mail steamer when they are captured by a disguised German commerce raider. They swim ashore when the raider is off German East Africa and have further adventures. Illustrations by courtesy of Project Gutenberg.

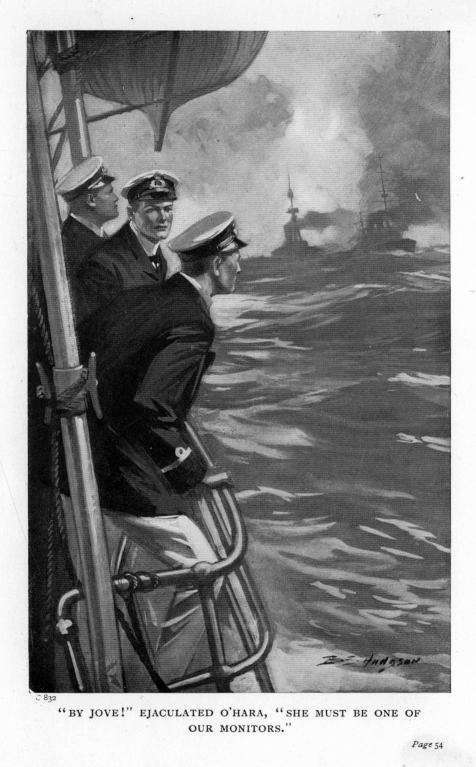
No. 1

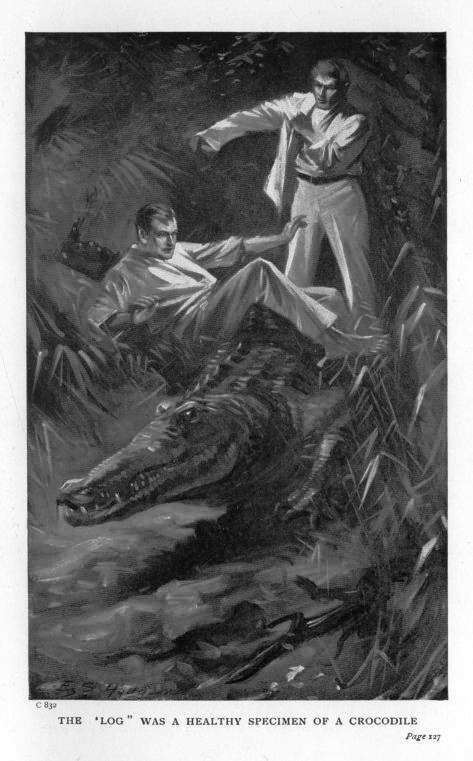
No. 2

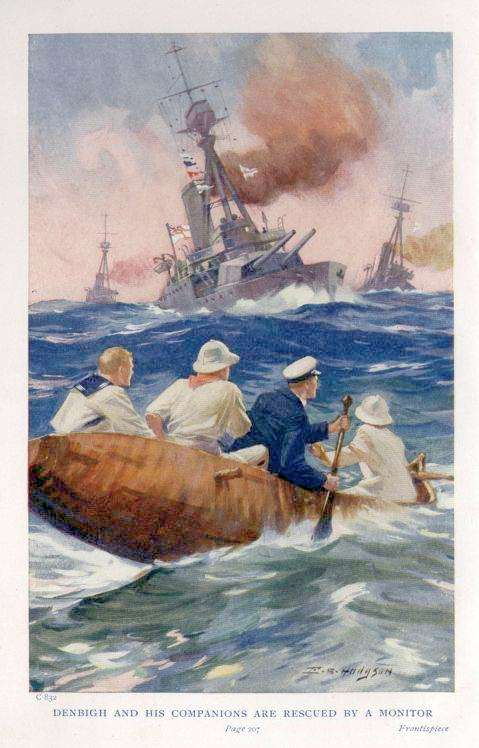
No. 3

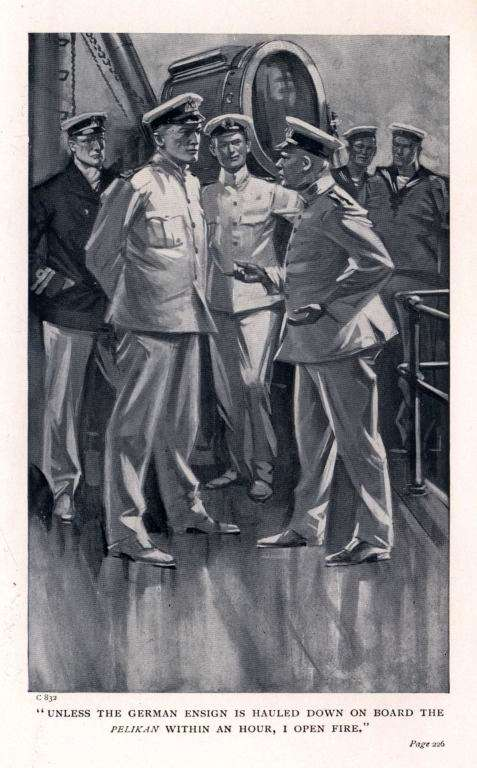
No. 4

Hodgson also provided the illustrations for Under the White Ensign by Westerman (Blackie and Son, London, 1917). In this story, two young Royal Naval Reserve officers have various adventures on their armed merchant cruiser in the Mediterranean. Illustrations by courtesy of Project Gutenberg.

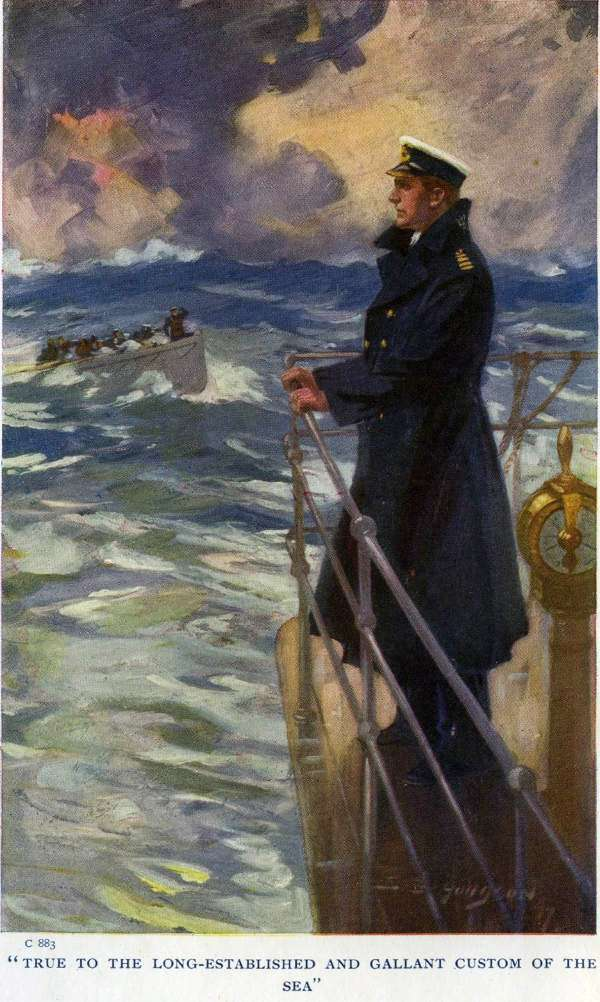
No. 1

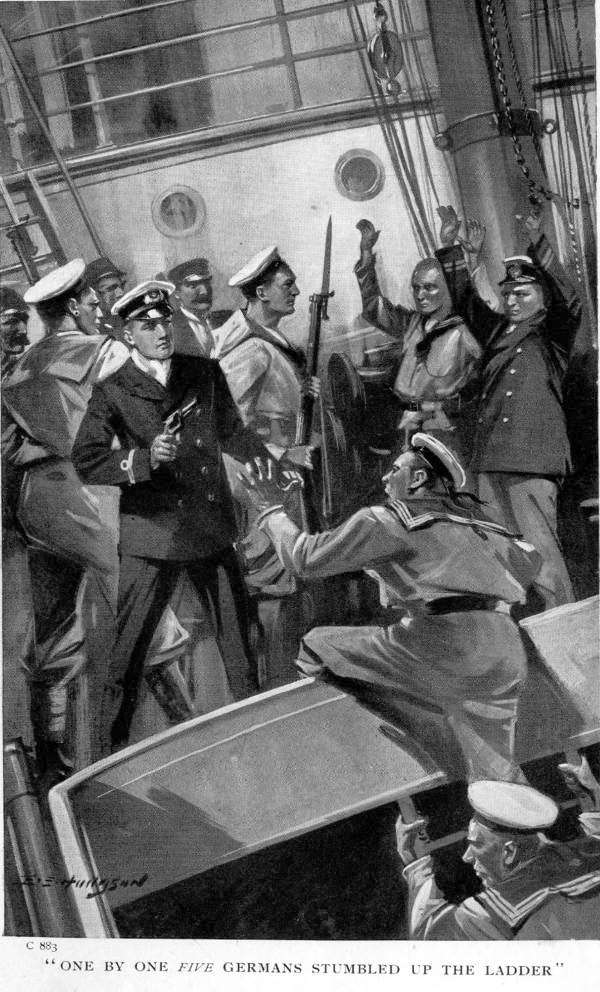
No. 2

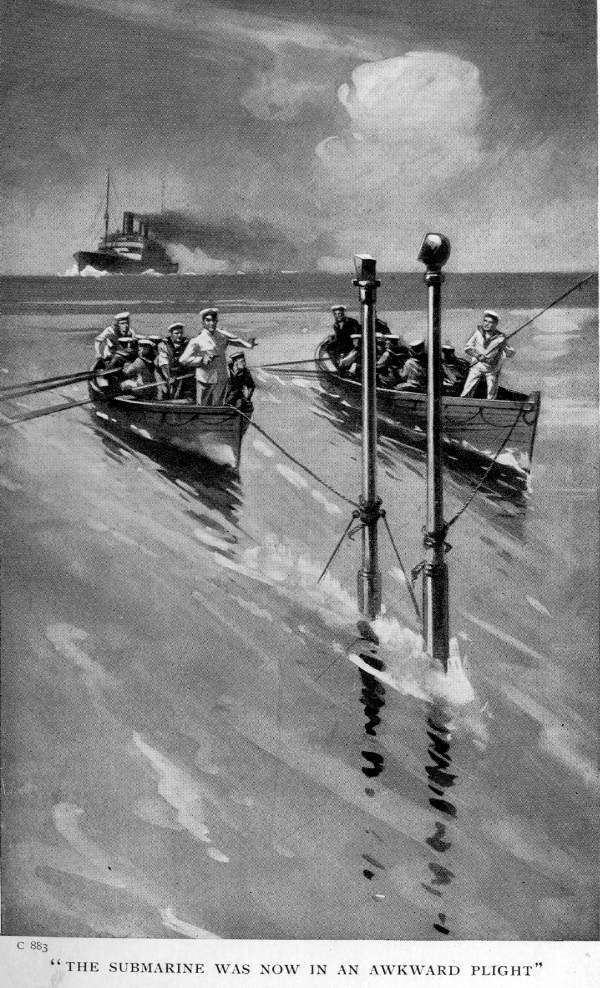
No. 3

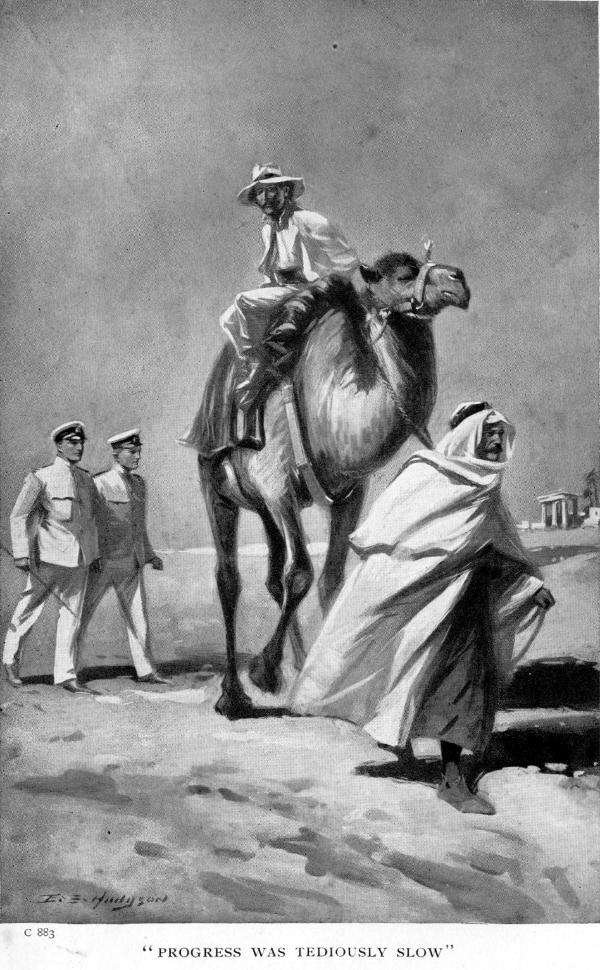
No. 4

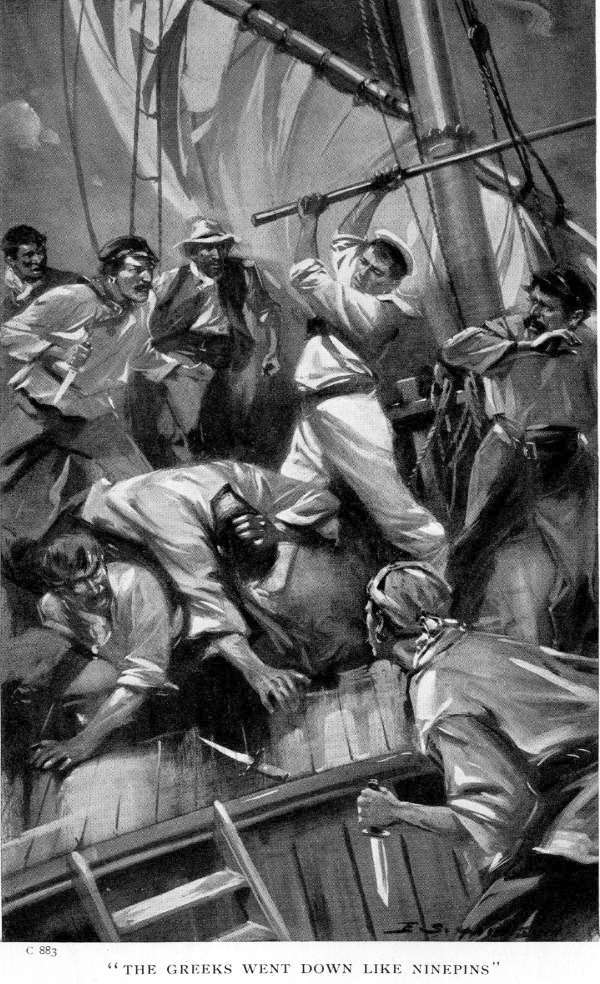
No. 5

Another work by Westerman that Hodgson illustrated was The Third Officer (Blackie and Son, London, 1921). This was a story of post-war piracy in which the crew of a ship are imprisoned on a small island and escape in a small open boat, only to face further disaster. Illustrations by courtesy of Project Gutenberg.

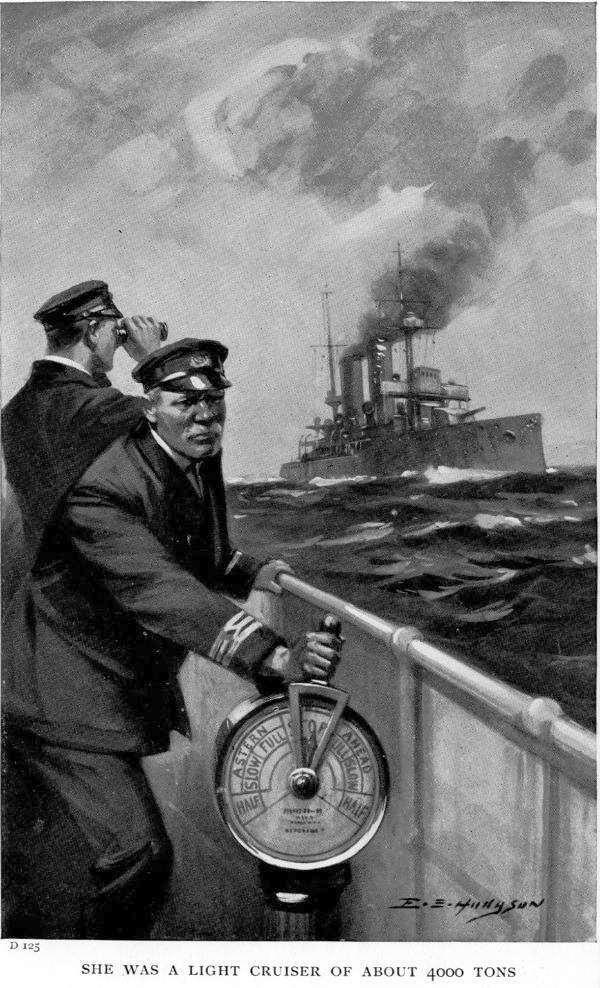
No. 1

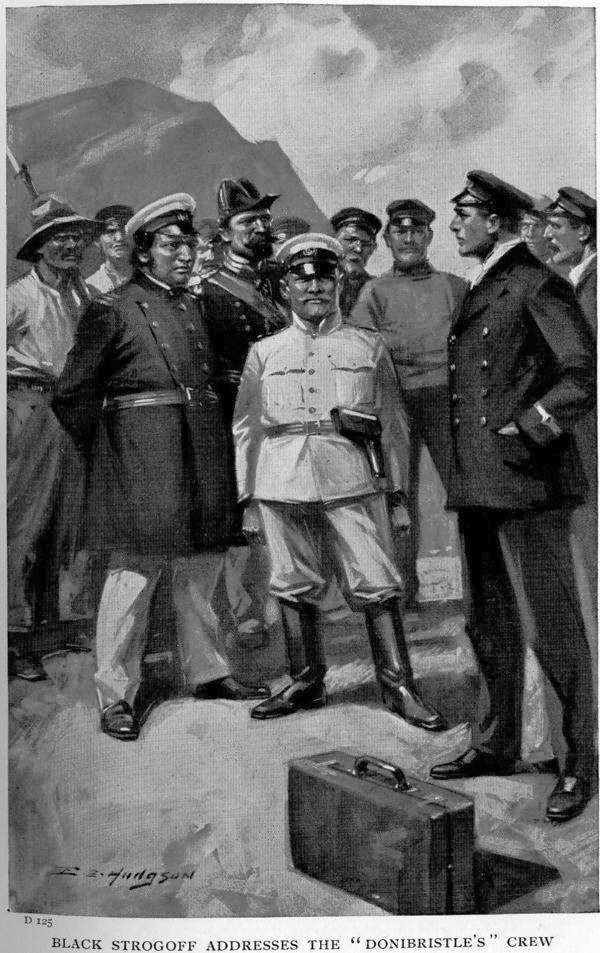
No. 2

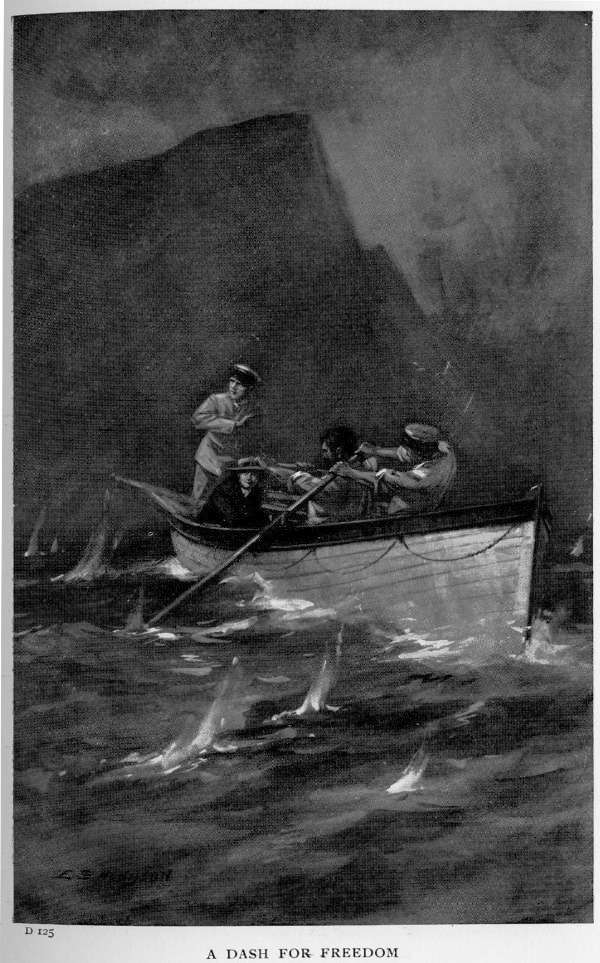
No. 3

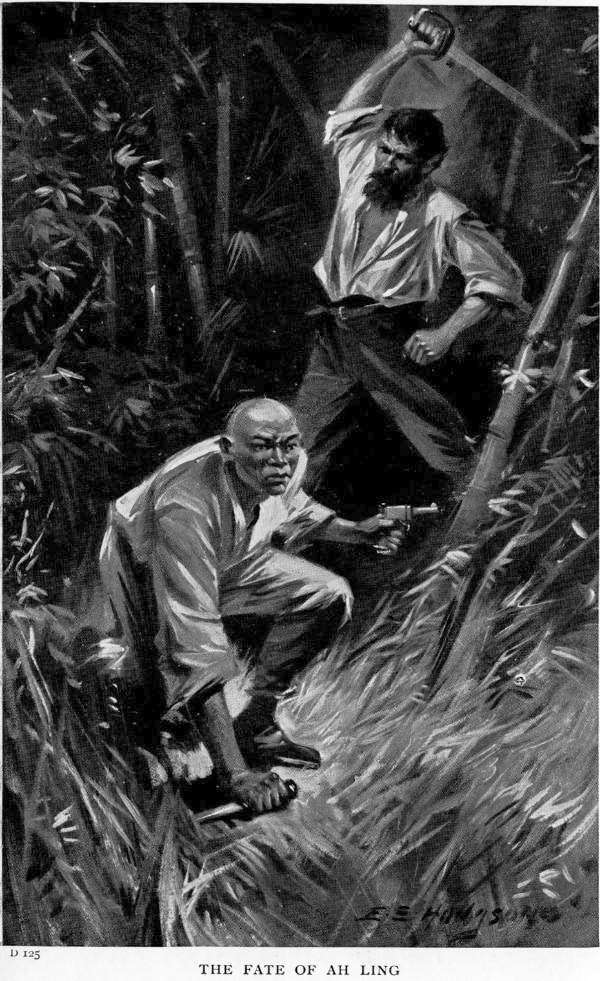
No. 3
