= Charles Murray Padday =

British painter and illustrator (1868–1954)

- Born: 15 January 1868; Notting Hill, London
- Died: 10 April 1954 (aged 86); Sussex
- Occupations: Painter and illustrator
- Years active: 1900-1938
- Known for: Paintings of sea themes
- Notable work: Dividing the Spoil

Charles Murray Padday, RI, ROI (1868–1954) was a British artist and illustrator. He was particularly known for his sea paintings.

== Early life ==
Paddy was born in London to Reginald Salmond Sheriff Paddy and Marie Elizabeth Ann. He was living in Notting Hill when baptised at two months of age. Two other places of birth are recorded:

- The 1881 Census (with information provided by the school) give Brighton, Sussex as his place of birth.
- The 1901 Census gave the place of birth of painter and artist Charles Padday, living on his own in Bosham (where Padday lived at the time) then 34 years, as the Straits Settlements - where Padday's father Reginald and three eldest siblings were born (Penang for the father and Singapore for his siblings).

The 1911 Census gives the place of birth as London.

Charles went to Hurstpierpoint school where he was recorded as a boarder at St John's House (the hall of residence for boarders) in the 1881 census. The school did not forget him as they reported in Public School Magazine in 1900 that Padday got two pictures in the RA in 1900.

== Life ==
Very little is known about his training as an artist, but he had enough resources to travel at his own cost. In 1903 Padday visited the United States, arriving at Ellis Island on the SS Minnetonka on 17 August, and arriving back in Portsmouth, first class, on the SS Auguste Victoria on 3 September. On arrival in Ellis Island he reported that he had paid his own passage and that he had previously visited the United States in 1895.

He married Irishwoman Rose Blanche Newman (1873-1966) on 19 December 1903 at All Saints Church in Knightsbridge. At the time he was living in Bosham in the Chichester District of West Sussex, but by 1905 he had moved to Itchenor, Chichester, West Sussex and remained there until at least 1907. By 1910 he had moved to South Lodge, Seaview Estate, Hayling Island.

His first marriage did not last and he filed for divorce on 7 February 1918, stating that Rose had deserted him over two years previously. He got a decree nisi on 30 October 1918, on the ground of her adultery with a retired Colonel. The respondent offered no defence. In 1912, he was with the Fleet at Kiel, when he received a letter from his wife announcing her intention of going away. She ultimately went off with the Colonel. A final decree for the divorce was issued on 12 May 1919. He married Bertha Jane Hughes (1875-1959) at Havant, Hampshire in June 1919. The Kelly's Directory has Padday living in Newin Green in Kent in 1922, couple moved to 25 Grimston Gardens, Folkestone, Kent, around 1928. Padday travelled with Rose to nearly every corner of the globe and painted scenes in every country he visited.

== Work ==
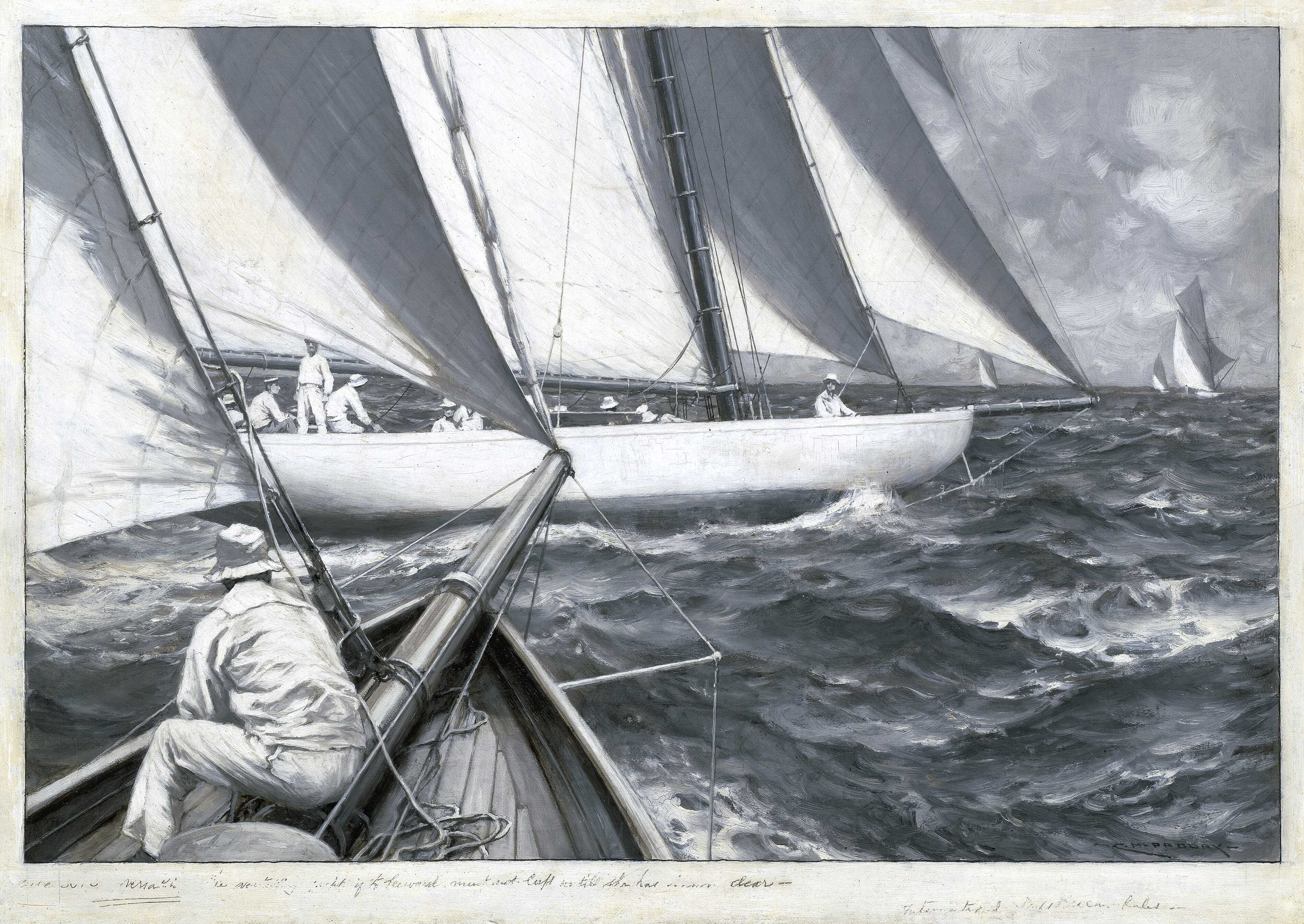
A yacht luffing, by Padday, who uses a monochromatic palette to make this oil painting look like a photograph. Original in the National Maritime Museum

Padday first exhibited at the Royal Academy in 1886, when he was 18, and continued to exhibit there for the next 40 years with only two or three years when he did not submit a work. Only once did he have a painting refused, and said that this was a picture in his early years. Sometimes he exhibited more than one painting, as in 1900 when he exhibited two oil paintings: Worsted, showing a defeated pirate ship, and Cribbage, showing a card game. Padday also exhibited at the Royal Society of British Artists, the Royal Institute of Painters in Water Colours, and the Royal Institute of Oil Painters. Padday sold one painting, Alone for £300 in 1905, a very significant sum then, and worth about £37,000 now.

Padday specialised in marine paintings. He painted coastal views and harbors, including Mediterranean scenes such as The Harbour at Bougie, Algeria. He also painted pirate scenes such as Loot, A difference and Dividing the Spoil (1919), which 91.5 x 128 cm oil painting, exhibited at the Royal Academy in 1919, sold for £18,750 in 2018. The Morning Post said of one of his pirate paintings, Marooned that it: would have gladdened the heart of Mr. R. L. Stevenson. Here are some of his piratical folk of bygone days in just such a plight as he might have evolved for them. Expelled from their ship, they have been placed ashore on a convenient Island. They are a fine trio, of which the vessel is well quit. . . . Mr. Padday's picture seems as literal a presentment of actual fact, so good in character and action are the figures, so finely suggested is the heated atmosphere of the torrid isle on whose strand these three men have been left to live or perish as Fate may will.

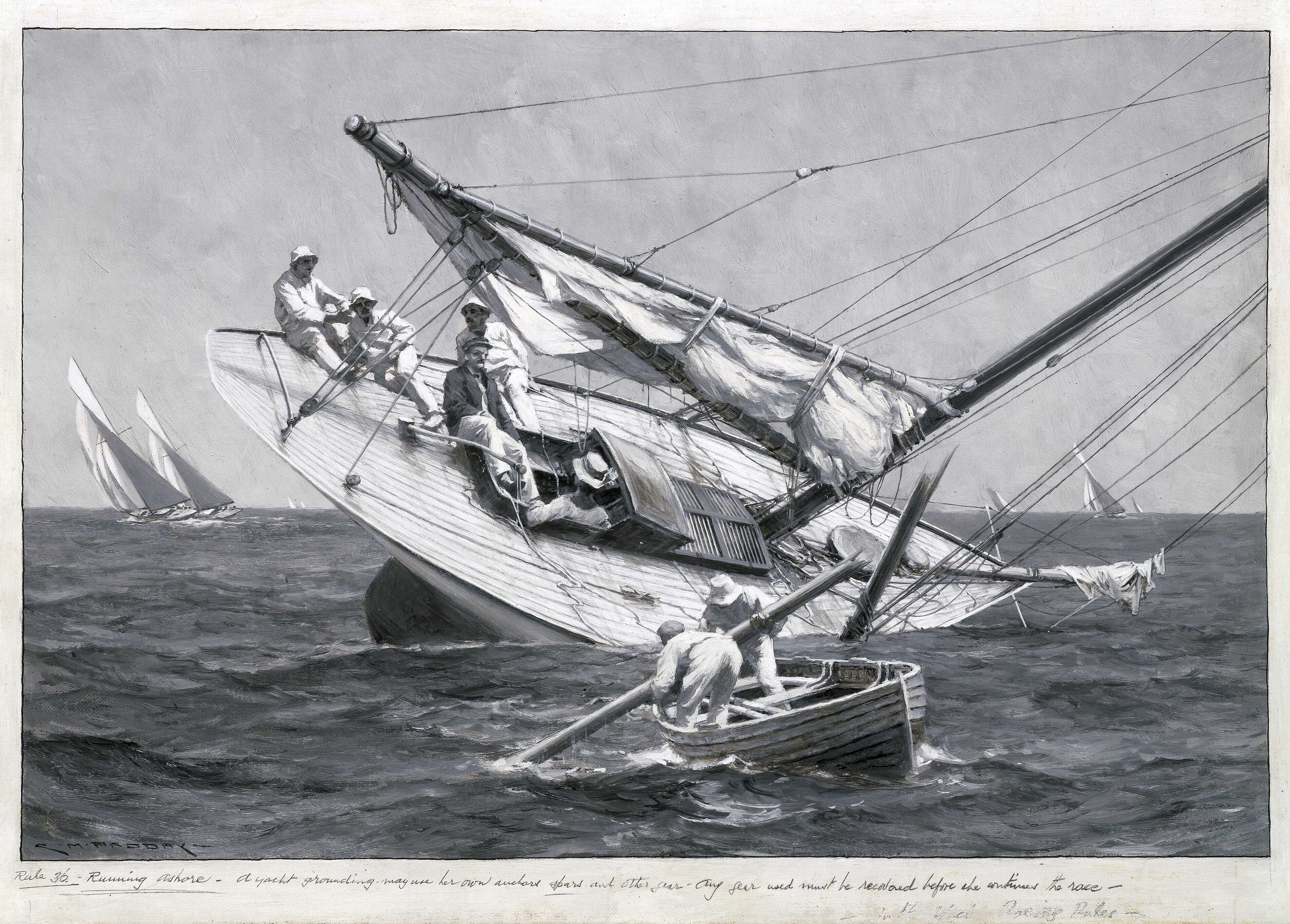
A yacht ashore by Padday. Original in the National Maritime Museum

Sea and sea-shore scenes include pieces such as The Pilot Boat Crew (1898), Study of a Clipper at Sea, Auction on the Beach, In Port, Fishing Boats in Harbour, White Star Line R.M.S.'Oceanic' , Iron-clad Naval Vessels in a Line and many more. Deakes notes that he executed some quite well-know yachting pictures and these include A Yacht Luffing, A Yacht Ashore, First Round on the Buoy, and Firing the Starting Gun. The Field's yachting correspondent noted of one nautical painting that it was well composed and correct in technical detail, whilst there is a clever effect of clearing rain in the picture.

Padday drew illustrations for several periodicals, including The Illustrated London News, The Sphere and The Pall Mall Magazine. He also illustrated many books including works by Samuel Taylor Coleridge, Percy F. Westerman, F. S. Brereton, Joseph Conrad, Rudyard Kipling, H. Taprell Dorling, Harry Collingwood, Lord Charles Beresford, T. T. Jeans, and others. He was commissioned to paint a number of works, including Our Safeguard by the Navy in 1917. It was originally intended to be placed behind a chapel altar, but was instead hung in the Reading Room of the Trafalgar Institute in Portsmouth, and prints of it were sold for the support of the institute. The painting, said to be worth several hundred pounds was hanging there twenty years later, and they were still selling prints to support the institute.

Two works by Padday are on display in the National Maritime Museum and another is in the Folkestone Museum.

== Death ==
He died on 10 April 1954 in Sussex, leaving an estate worth £2,843 7s. His widow Bertha Jane was his executor. At the time of his death he was living in Paddocks Land, Tyler's Green, Cuckfield, Sussex. Bertha Jane survived him by five years, dying in Torquay, Devon on 13 September 1960, and leaving an estate valued at £728,192 9s 9d.

== Gallery ==
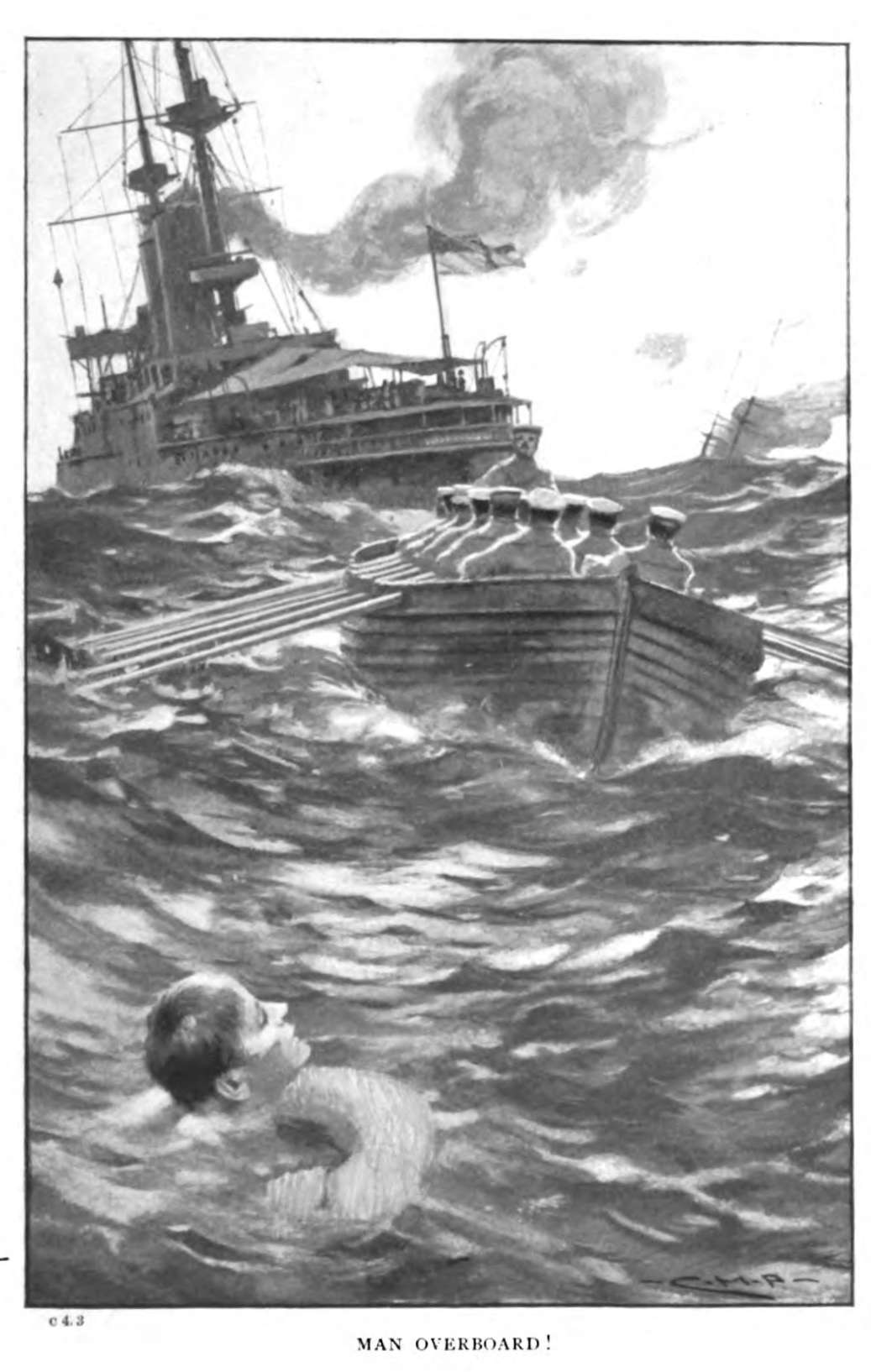
Illus.1

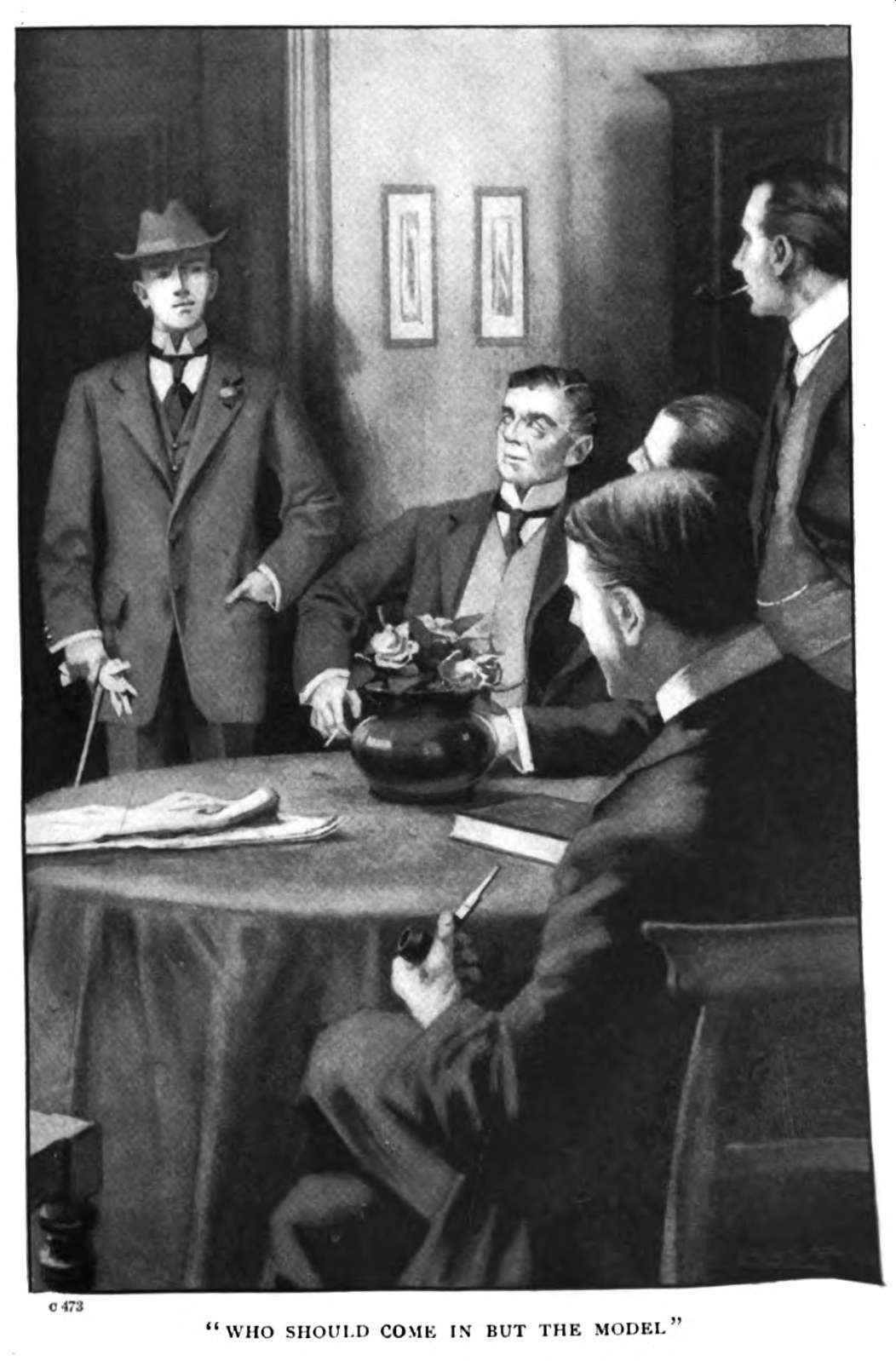
Illus.2

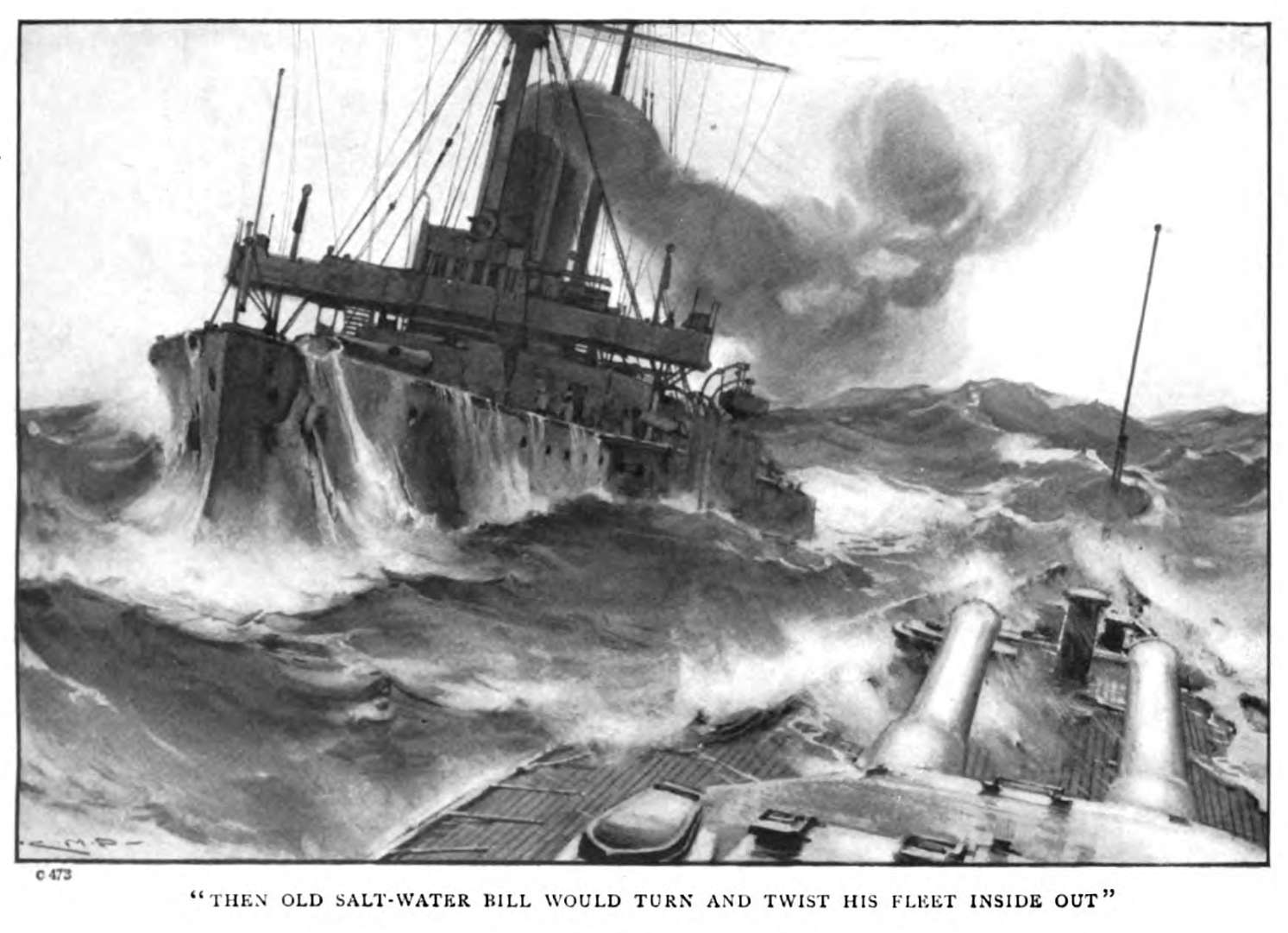
Illus.3

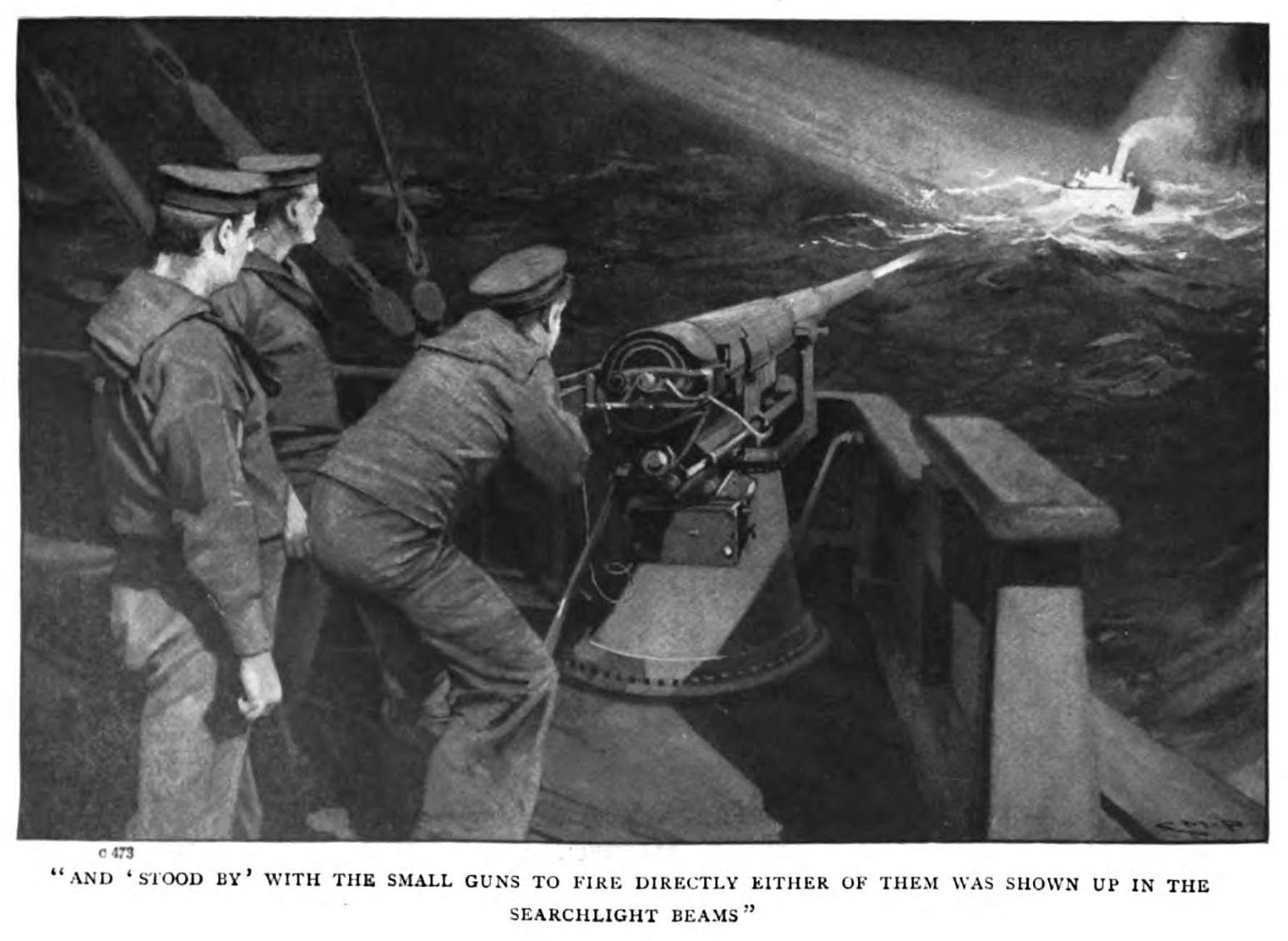
Illus.4

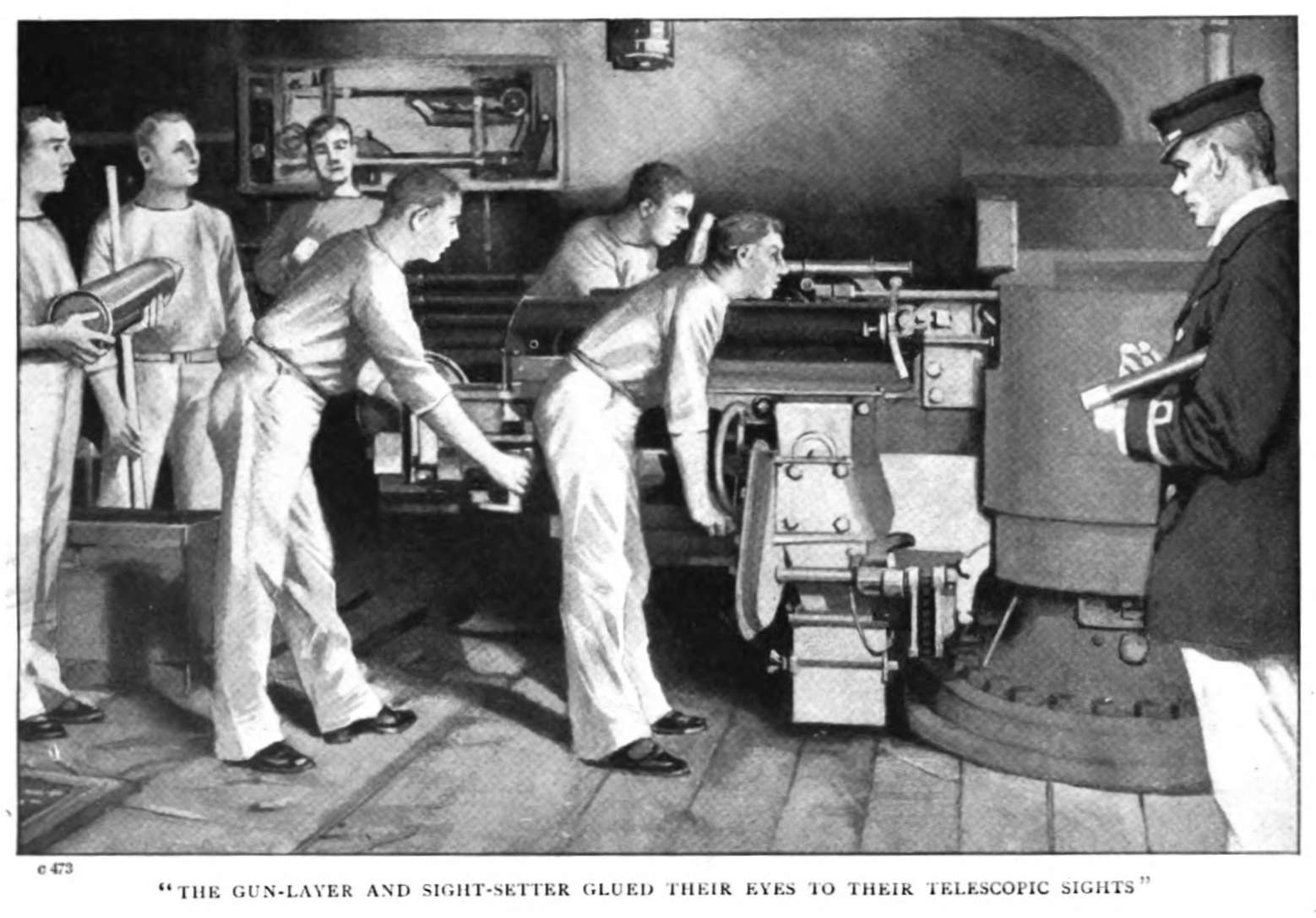
Illus.5

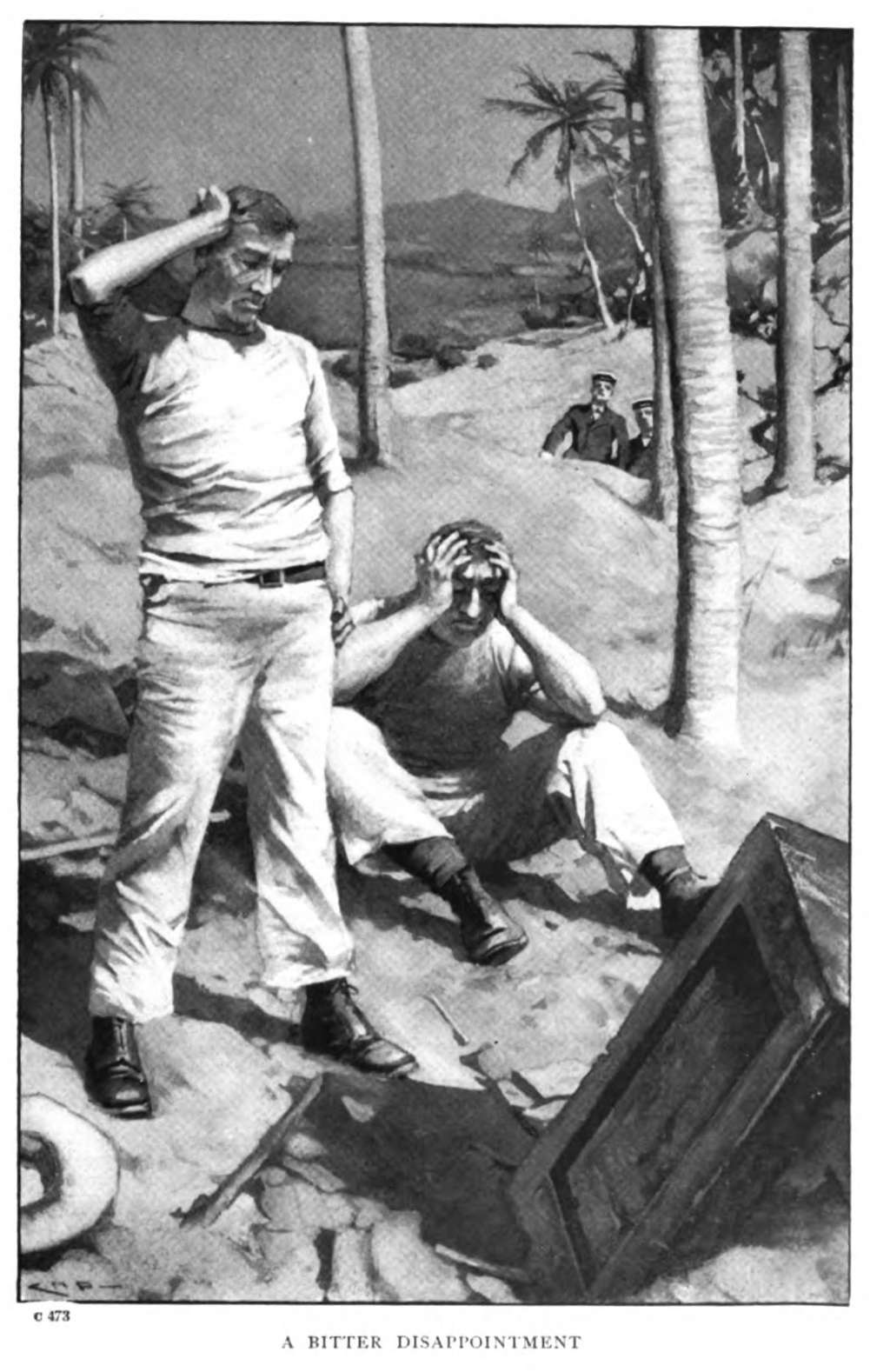
Illus.6

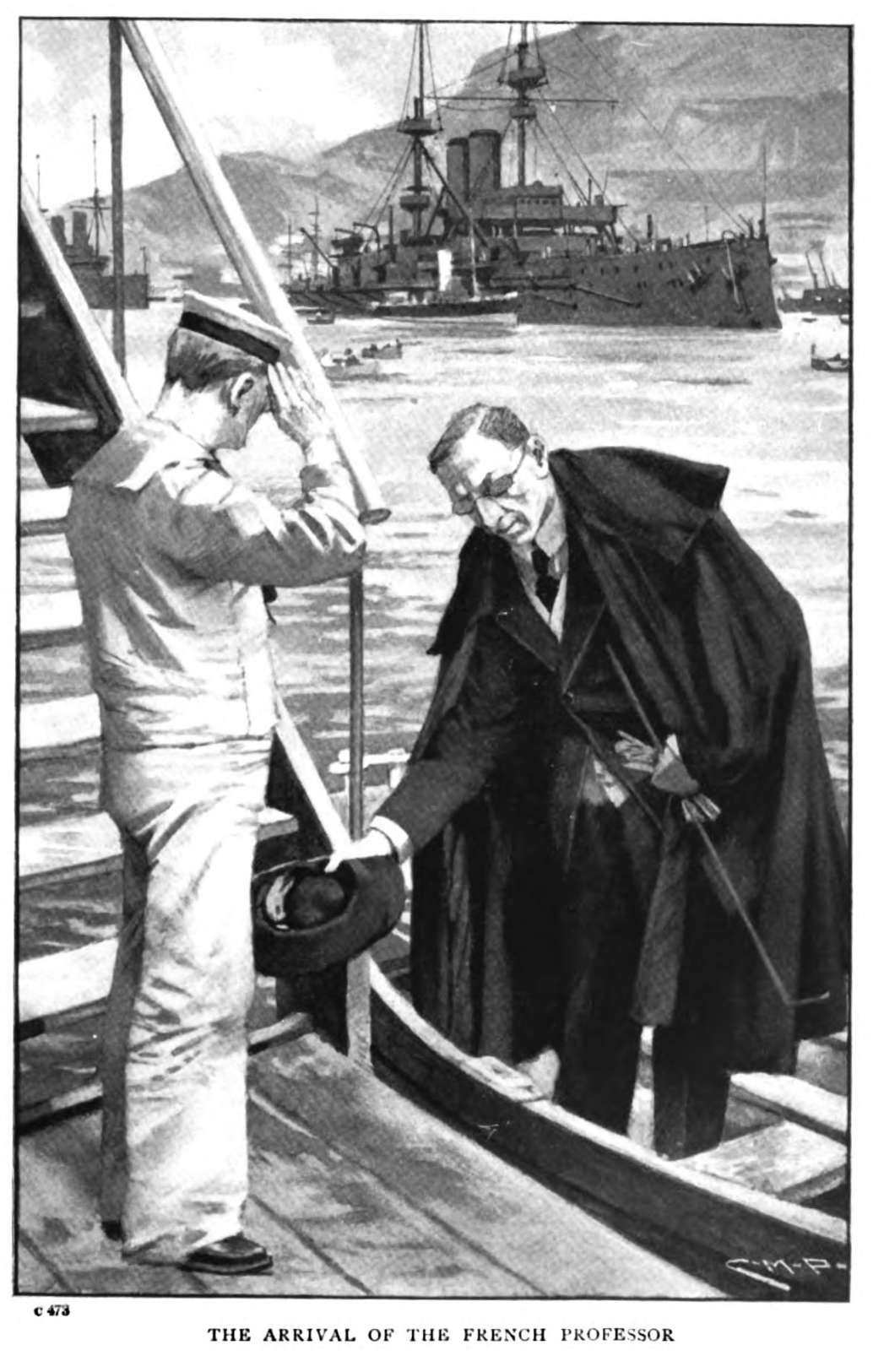
Illus.7

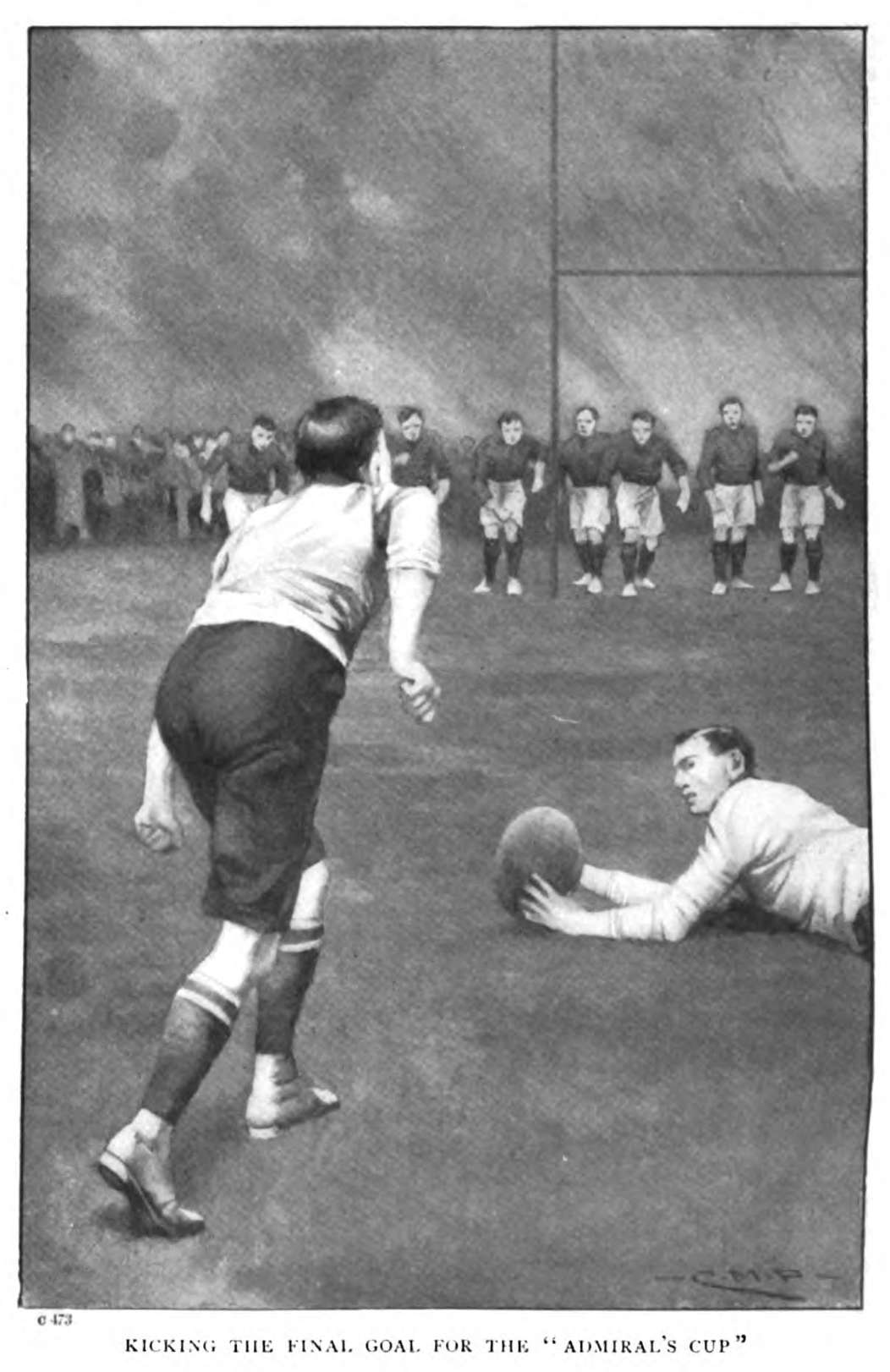
Illus.8
