= Jim Weiss =

American author

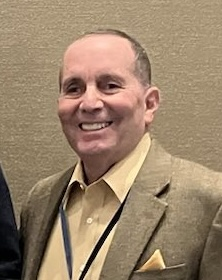
- Weiss in 2023 at the GHISfCE conference
- Occupation: Storyteller
- Years active: 1989–present

Jim Weiss (born November 24, 1948, in Highland Park, Illinois) is an American children's audio storyteller, book narrator and author.

Since 1989 Weiss has released over seventy audio recordings, for preschool through college, of classic and/or historical books with an emphasis on character building. He is a Storytelling World Award winner and his work has been recognized by the Film Advisory Board, American Library Association, and Parents' Guide to Children's Media for his contribution to storytelling and audio entertainment.

Examples of his expressive retellings include various works of Shakespeare, The Three Musketeers, American Tall Tales, Sherlock Holmes and Aesop's fables. The book selections are supportive of educators within the classical education movement in addition to having a following within homeschool circles and Christian families. Weiss is also the narrator for the audio versions of Susan Wise Bauer's popular The Story of the World series.

His work was originally released by Great Hall Productions founded by Weiss and his wife Randy with the maxim "Intelligent Entertainment for the Thinking Family." Today his body of work is published by Well-Trained Mind Press, available on CDs and streaming with audiobook services and apps. As of 2022 he was producing two recordings a year. The Weiss' have one daughter along with her family, and live in Tucson, Arizona.

== Book Recordings - partial listing ==
=== G.A. Henty ===
- Henty Short Stories (Volume I) | 1800s, frontier Ohio & England
- The Cat of Bubastes | 1250 BC Egypt
- The Young Carthaginian | 220 BC Rome & Carthage
- Beric the Briton. | 62 AD Ancient Britain & Rome
- For the Temple | 70 AD Jerusalem
- Wulf the Saxon | 1066, England
- In Freedom’s Cause | 1296-1314, Scotland & England
- The Lion of St Mark | 1300s, Venice, Italy
- The Lion of the North | 1618-1648, Thirty Years War, Europe
- In the Reign of Terror | 1793, French Revolution

The nine Henty novels are “thoughtfully abridged” which is described as minor edits removing vast amounts of repetition.

=== World history and stories ===
==== The Ancient World to 70 AD ====
- Story of the World, Vol. I: The Ancients | 5000 BC – 400 AD
- Bible Stories: Great Men and Women From Noah through Solomon | 2000s BC - 900s BC Middle East
- Tales from the Old Testament | 6000 BC - 400 BC Middle East
- Egyptian Treasures: Mummies & Myths | 3000 BC
- Tales from Cultures Far & Near | 3000 BC, China
- The Dragon Diaries: Dragon Stories From Around the World | 3000 BC
- Jewish Holiday Stories | 2000 BC - 300 BC, Middle East
- Pharaohs and Queens of Ancient Egypt | 1500 BC - 1200 BC
- The Cat of Bubastes by G. A. Henty | 1250 BC, Egypt
- Greek Myths | 1000 BC
- She & He: Adventures in Mythology | 1000 BC, Greece
- Courage and a Clear Mind: True Adventures of Ancient Greeks | 1000 BC
- Shakespeare for Children, A Midsummer’s Night Dream | 1000 BC, Greece
- Heroes in Mythology | 1000 BC, Greece
- A Treasury of Wisdom (Solomon) | 1000 BC, Israel
- Animal Tales (Aesop) | 600 BC
- Galileo & the Stargazers (Archimedes) | 400 BC, Sicily
- A Treasury of Wisdom (Diogenes) | 400 BC, Greece
- A Treasury of Wisdom (Alexander the Great) | 300 BC, Greece
- The Young Carthaginian by G. A. Henty | 220 BC, Rome/Carthage
- Julius Caesar and the Story of Rome | 44 BC
- A Treasury of Wisdom (The Good Samaritan) | 1st Century AD
- Beric the Briton | 62 AD, Ancient Britain, Rome
- For The Temple by G. A. Henty | 70 AD. Jerusalem
