= John Geddie (journalist) =

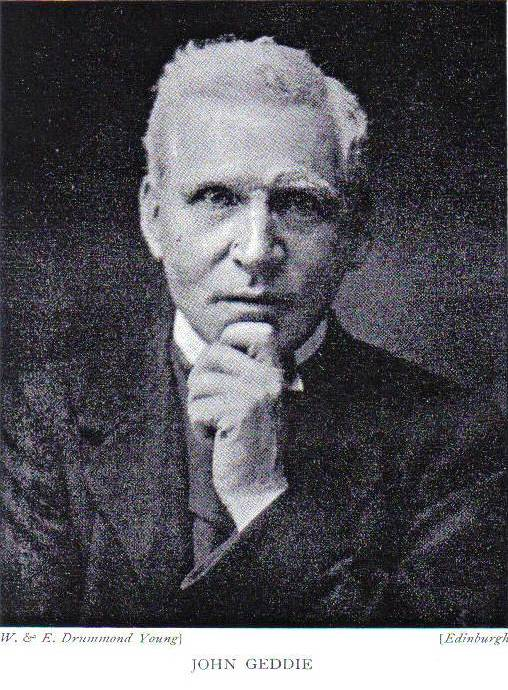
- Photograph copied from the frontispiece of his book: Thomas the Rymour and his Rhymes.
- Born: 8 December 1846; Garmouth, Moray, Scotland, U.K.
- Died: 20 January 1927 (aged 80); Edinburgh, Scotland, U.K.
- Occupations: Writer; journalist; editor; lawyer; biographer
- Spouse: Isabella Cecilia Young
- Children: Three sons and three daughters
- Writing career
- Genres: Non-fiction, biography, politics, geography

John Geddie (1848–1937) was a journalist and author of several books mainly on the subject of Edinburgh. His earliest books were about foreign parts but it is not known whether he actually visited these places.

== Life ==
Geddie was born on 8 December 1846 in Garmouth, Moray on the River Spey and in the Parish of Speymouth, Moray. He was the son of James Geddie, a shipbuilder, and of Margaret Spence. He was educated at Garmouth Free Church School and at Milne's Institution, Fochabers. From 1864 to 1870 he was a law clerk in Elgin and Edinburgh and attended law classes at Edinburgh University. While attending these classes, he encountered Robert Louis Stevenson on the few occasions that the latter attended the conveyancing class.

In June 1882, Geddie became a Fellow of the Royal Geographical Society. He was recommended as Fellow by John Bartholomew and the geographer, John Francon Williams (father of missionary and writer, Aeneas Francon Williams). (Note: Information supplied by e-mail by the librarian of the Royal Geographical Society. He is recorded there as being a journalist living at South Lothian Street, Edinburgh.) This followed the publication of his works on Africa, the Himalayas and the Russian Empire. As the latter work is 572 pages long and seems written by someone with an intimate knowledge of Russia, he may have travelled there though there is no record of this.

In 1889, Geddie joined the Institute of Journalists. According to Neil Macara Brown: "Geddie is credited with coining the term 'wee free' in reference to the remnant of the Free Church of Scotland. In a leader he jibed: 'It is hard to see how the poor wee Free Church, which has just come into so overwhelming an inheritance, is to free itself; even if it wished, from the fortune which the law has hung about its neck.'"

In 1875, he married Isabella Cecilia Young (d. 1931) and they had four sons and three daughters. His interests were golf, cycling, and especially walking. He played a major role in the establishment of the Braid Hills Public Golf Course and the Edinburgh Evening Dispatch Trophy there in 1888. He died in Edinburgh on 20 January 1937.

== His career in journalism ==
- 1870-1889 - Sub-Editor with The Scotsman.
- 1886-1889 - Lead Writer with the Edinburgh Evening Dispatch
- 1889-1929 - Assistant Editor and Lead Writer with The Scotsman

== Published books ==
- Lake Regions of Central Africa: A Record of Discovery, Edinburgh and London: Nelson, 1881.
- Beyond the Himalayas: A Story of Adventure, Edinburgh and London: Nelson, 1882.
- The Russian Empire: Historical and Descriptive, Nelson, 1882.
- The Fringes of Fife, (illustrated), Edinburgh: D. Douglas, 1894.
- The Balladists, Edinburgh: Oliphant, Anderson and Ferrier, July 1896, ("Famous Scots Series").
- The Water of Leith, From Source to Sea, With illustrations by Joseph Brown; Edinburgh : W. H. White & Co., 1896.
- The Home Country of R. L. Stevenson. Being the Valley of the Water of Leith from source to sea, illustrated by Joseph Brown, (second edition), Edinburgh and London : W. H. White & Co., 1898.
- Romantic Edinburgh, London : Sands & Co., 1900, (with editions in 1911 and 1929).
- Souvenir of the opening of the North British Station Hotel, Edinburgh, 15 October 1902, Edinburgh: Banks & Co., 1902.
- Edinburgh in Pictures, (edited), London: Sands & Co., 1903.
- The Heart of Edinburgh, with eight illustrations by Philip B. Whelpley. (pp. 131. Sands & Co.: Edinburgh & London, 1913.)
- Thomas the Rymour and his Rhymes.[With a portrait of the author], Edinburgh: Printed for the Rymour Club and issued from John Knox's House, 1920.
- The Scott country, painted by E.W. Haslehust, London : Blackie & Son Ltd., 1922]
- The Shores of Fife, painted by E.W. Haslehust. London, [1922.])
- The Fringes of Edinburgh, illustrated by Arthur Wall, London and Edinburgh: W. & R. Chambers, 1926.
- London Morayshire Club, Old Morayshire Characters, (Edited), Elgin, 1931.
- Edinburgh, the Borders and the Trossachs, painted by E.W. Haslehust, London : Blackie & Son Ltd, 1933.
- Edinburgh, painted by E.W. Haslehust, London and Glasgow: Blackie & Son Ltd., 1936.

== Sources ==
- https://web.archive.org/web/20120224104245/http://www.suntree.us/geddieworld/gedalbum5.html
- http://www.scoop-database.com/bio/geddie_john
- http://www.bl.uk
