= Beautiful England =

Series of short, illustrated travel/guide books

Beautiful England was the title of a series of short, illustrated travel/guide books first published in Britain by Blackie & Son around 1910 and continuing in print until the 1950s. Each title featured a particular region, town or city in England and was illustrated by watercolour landscape painter, E. W. Haslehust.

Blackie & Son also published other related series: "Beautiful Scotland" (4 vols. or 4 pts. in 1 vol.), "Beautiful Ireland" (Leinster, Ulster, Munster, Connaught; painted by Alex. Williams; described by Stephen Gwynn; 4 vols. or 4 pts. in 1) and "Beautiful Switzerland" (Chamonix; Lausanne and its Environs; Lucerne; Villars and its Environs: all pictured and described by George Flemwell).

== Book titles ==
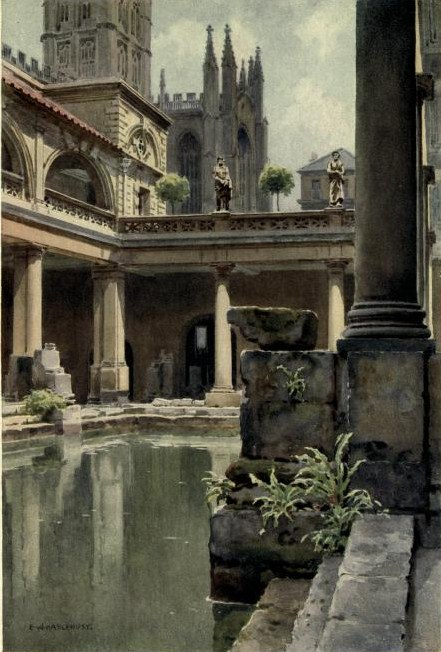
The Roman Bath in Bath, Somerset (from Bath and Wells, 1914)

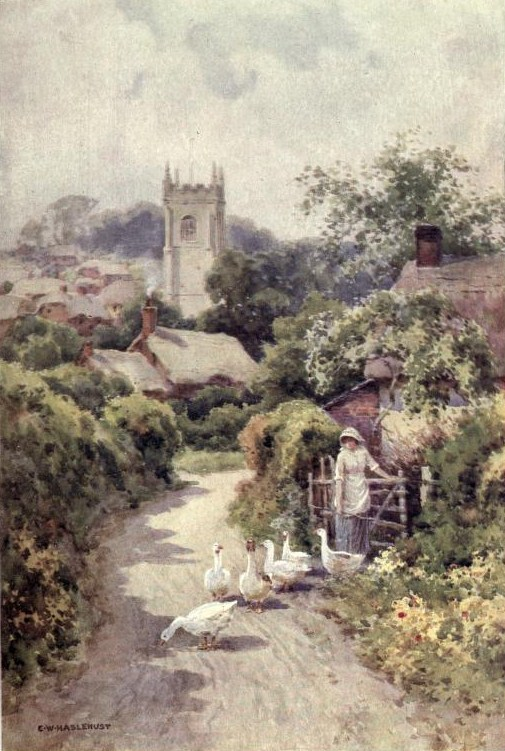
Bere Regis, Dorset (from The Heart of Wessex, 1910)

"Beautiful England" series

- Bradley, A. G. The English Lakes (1910).
- Heath, Sidney. Winchester (1911).
- Danks, William. Canterbury (1910).
- Thomas, Edward. Windsor Castle (1910).
- Heath, Sidney. The Heart of Wessex (1910).
- How, Frederick Douglas. Oxford (1910).
- Jerrold, Walter. Norwich and the Broads (1910).
- Mitton, G. E. The Thames (1910).
- Jerrold, Walter. Shakespeare-Land (1910).
- Barwell, Noel. Cambridge (1911).
- Benson, George. York (1911).
- Thomas, Edward. The Isle of Wight (1911).
- Edwards, Charles & Bennett, J. H. E. Chester (1911).
- Gilchrist, R. Murray. The Peak District (1911).
- Heath, Sidney. The Cornish Riviera (1911).
- Nicklin, J. A. Dickens Land (1911).
- Godfrey, Elizabeth. The New Forest (1912).
- Heath, Sidney. Exeter (1912).
- Jerrold, Walter. Hampton Court (1912).
- Gilchrist, R. Murray. The Dukeries (1913).
- Edwardes, Charles. Hereford (1913).
- Morley, George. Warwick and Leamington (1913).
- Salmon, Arthur Leslie. Dartmoor (1913).
- Salmon, Arthur Leslie. Bath and Wells (1914).
- Gilchrist, R. Murray. Scarborough And Neighbourhood (1914).
- Gilchrist, R. Murray. Ripon and Harrogate (1914).
- Heath, Sidney. Bournemouth, Poole and Christchurch (1915).
- Heath, Sidney. Swanage and District (1915).
- Higgins, Walter. Hastings and Neighbourhood (1920).
- Jerrold, Walter. Folkestone and Dover (1920).
- Jerrold, Walter. The Heart of London (1924).
- Jerrold, Walter. Through London's Highways (1924).
- Jerrold, Walter. In London's By-Ways (1925).
- Jerrold, Walter. Rambles in Greater London (1925).

"Beautiful Scotland" series

- Eyre-Todd, George. Loch Lomond, Loch Katrine, and the Trossachs (1922).
- Geddie, John. Edinburgh (1936).
- Geddie, John. The Scott Country (1938).
- Geddie, John. The Shores of Fife (1922).

"Beautiful Ireland" series

- Gwynn, S. L. Ulster (1911).
- Gwynn, S. L. Leinster (1911).
- Gwynn, S. L. Munster (1912).
- Gwynn, S. L. Connaught (1912)
- Gorges, Mary. Killarney (1912).
