= In the Reign of Terror =

1888 novel by G. A. Henty

In the Reign of Terror: The Adventures of a Westminster Boy
- Title page for In the Reign of Terror: The Adventures of a Westminster Boy
- Author: G. A. Henty
- Language: English
- Genre: Boy's Adventure; Historical Fiction
- Publisher: Blackie and Son
- Publication date: 1888
- Publication place: United Kingdom
- Media type: Print (hardback)

In the Reign of Terror: The Adventures of a Westminster Boy is a novel by G. A. Henty published in 1888. The novel follows the adventures of Harry Sandwith, an English boy sent to live with the Marquis de St. Caux during the height of the French Revolution.

== Plot summary ==
=== Synopsis ===
Harry Sandwith, a sixteen-year-old English boy, is sent to live in France with the Marquis de St. Caux, a friend of a French nobleman Harry's father once served. The marquis is impressed with the English system of schooling and believes that his two sons, Ernest and Jules, will benefit from the influence and friendship of an independent and manly English boy. Harry, who is an undistinguished, average student at Westminster School, is eager for the opportunity to live in France, which he believes will create greater opportunities for him when he joins the British Army. Harry sets off for Paris in 1790 with the intention of living with the St. Caux family for the next two to three years.

Harry is escorted to the marquis's château near Dijon. He meets the marquis and his wife, along with their two sons, Ernest and Jules, and three daughters, Marie, Jeanne, and Virginie. The marquis is impressed by Harry's confidence and self-possession in such an unfamiliar environment, but the rest of the family remains unconvinced and mocks his strange mannerisms and rough appearance. Their attitude changes, however, after Harry succeeds in killing a rabid dog that attacks Jeanne and Virginie. They begin to accept Harry as a member of the family, and Harry and Ernest become close friends, hunting and adventuring together and even managing to kill the Demon Wolf that long terrorised the communities surrounding the chateau.

During the years of Harry's life at the chateau, the French Revolution continues to progress throughout the country. As a member of the French nobility, the marquis and his family are loyal to King Louis XVI and are deeply troubled by the growing violence and unrest in Paris and the countryside. After the royal family unsuccessfully attempts to flee Paris, the marquis decides to move the St. Caux family to Paris to support the king and to avoid the growing unrest of the peasants living in the countryside.

The situation in Paris continues to deteriorate and soon an arrest order is made for all the members of noble families. The marquis and marquise submit to the arrest but tell their children to escape, sending Ernest and Jules out of Paris to make for England and hiding the girls with the marquise's former nurse, Louise Moulin. Harry is free to return to England, but chooses to stay in Paris to look after the girls and help them flee to England should the need arise.

Harry attempts to find a way to free the marquis and marquise, but he is too late. On the day of the September massacres the prisoners throughout Paris are brought out for mock trials and systematically executed, including the Marquis and Marquise de St. Caux. Victor de Gisons, Marie's fiancé who stayed in Paris to watch out for her, sees his father brought out for trial and flies into a rage. Harry succeeds in knocking him out and carrying him away, aided by a sympathetic Parisian who brings Victor back to his home.

Leaving a grief-stricken and insensate Victor with his rescuers, Jacques and Elise Medart. Harry informs the girls of their parents' deaths. He soon discovers that Ernest and Jules were both killed on their way to England, but decides to tell the girls only when, or if, they reach England safely. Soon after, Marie is caught in the marketplace by Lebat, the son of the mayor of Dijon, who arrests her as a noble’s daughter in hiding.

Harry despairs of finding a way to rescue Marie. He manages to get a letter to her, but thinks it unlikely that he will be able to free her from the prison. She writes back and tells him that Lebat has offered to free her on the condition that she marries him, which she refuses.

One evening, Harry rescues a man being beaten in the street. The man turns out to be Maximilien de Robespierre, a radical leader of the Revolution, who vows to repay Harry's brave service. Seeing this as an opportunity to use Robespierre to free Marie, Harry agrees to be his secretary. After several months he discovers that Marie is soon to be tried and executed, and that Louise and the girls are under suspicion. He asks Robespierre to free Marie as repayment of his debt, but Robespierre refuses. Soon after, Lebat asks Robespierre to free Marie, as she has agreed to marry him and he knows that she is a friend of the Revolution. Robespierre consents, and that night Harry seizes the opportunity to kill Lebat and rescue Marie with the letter of release from Robespierre.

Harry travels to Nantes with Louise and the girls while Marie stays in Paris with Victor, who is slowly recovering. Upon their arrival in Nantes, Harry struggles to find a ship that will carry them to England. Louise, weakened by the long and trying journey, soon falls ill and dies. Jeanne finds passage to England with a fisherman named Adolphe, the husband of Martha Pichon, a woman whose child Jeanne helped nurse back to health. Before they can make the arrangements, however, Jeanne and Virginie are arrested. Harry narrowly rescues them from being drowned in the river with the other prisoners, and they find a trustworthy captain to take them to England.

They arrive safely in England and Harry is reunited with his family, who thought him long dead in the violence of the Revolution. Several years later, Harry marries Jeanne after he passes his medical exams and joins his father's practice. Virginie marries one of Harry's brothers, Tom, and the girls and their husbands later travel back to France for a short time to stay with Marie and Victor, who, after fighting in the French Army under Napoleon, purchases the chateau that once belonged to the Marquis de St. Caux.

=== Main characters ===
- Harry Sandwith – The protagonist, Harry is a young English boy sent to live with the St. Caux family, a family of French aristocrats. During the height of the French Revolution, he helps Jeanne and Virginie, the two youngest St. Caux daughters, escape to England.
- Dr. and Mrs. Sandwith – Harry Sandwith's parents. Harry becomes a doctor and joins his father's practice.
- Marquis and Marquise de St. Caux – The St. Caux parents, who are wealthy French aristocrats. Both are killed during the September Massacres.
- Marie de St. Caux – The oldest St. Caux daughter. Marie chooses to stay in Paris with her fiancé, Victor, while her sisters and Harry flee to England.
- Jeanne de St. Caux – The middle St. Caux daughter. Jeanne and Harry marry in England after Harry becomes a doctor.
- Virginie de St. Caux – The youngest St. Caux daughter. Virginie marries Harry's brother, Tom.
- Ernest de St. Caux – The oldest St. Caux son. Ernest and Harry become good friends while Harry lives with the St. Caux family. He and Jules are killed while trying to flee France.
- Jules de St. Caux – The youngest St. Caux son. Jules attempts to flee France with Ernest, but both boys are killed.
- Victor de Gisons – Marie de St. Caux's fiancé. After he and Marie marry, Victor purchases the chateau that had belonged to the St. Caux family.

== Literary and Historical Background ==
In the Reign of Terror was published in 1888 by Blackie and Son, a publishing company located in Glasgow, Scotland, and London, England. It was published nearly a century after the events of the French Revolution, and in his preface Henty states that the purpose of the novel is not "to impart historical knowledge, for the facts of the dreadful time when 'the terror' reigned supreme in France are well known to all educated lads." He addresses the novel to "My Dear Lads," a common practice in boys' adventure novels and with Henty's texts in particular. Like many of Henty's historical adventure novels, In the Reign of Terror emphasises the importance of British morals and encourages young boys to be courageous and virtuous.

== Genre and style ==
=== Genres ===
- Historical Fiction In the Reign of Terror is one of over one hundred historical fiction novels written by G.A. Henty, who is considered to be "the most popular nineteenth-century English writer of historical fiction for boys." These novels combine the popular adventure fiction genre with historical settings and events, writing from the prospective of a protagonist living through a specific historical period. Typically historical fiction operates on an artistic license that permits some deviation from the details of a historical setting, providing that events and historical figures not be too dramatically altered. Harry's life and experiences in France are set against the backdrop of the French Revolution. The narrative depicts important events and figures of the Revolution, including the September Massacres, the Drownings at Nantes, and Robespierre.
- Adventure fiction The novel is part of the large and popular subgenre of 19th-century boy's adventure fiction. G.A. Henty was among the first writers to popularise the genre for children; like much of the work of this genre, In the Reign of Terror is a novel directed at young boys and written from the perspective of a young boy. British adventure fiction of the period and style frequently promoted British nationalism and the Empire, and served as a manual of British morals and cultural values. Harry, as the protagonist, is "frank and pragmatic" and "embodies liberal virtues of individual courage and accomplishment." He is positioned as an idealised image of British boyhood: noble, virtuous, intelligent, and self-sufficient. Conventions of the genre present in the novel include the boyhood adventures Harry embarks upon while living at the St. Caux chateau, Harry’s brave and quick-witted rescues of the St. Caux daughters as he helps them flee to England, and the commentary on British and French class structures and the superiority of British masculinity and strength.

=== Style ===
Henty's historical adventure novels were primarily written for children, which is reflected in his simplistic writing style and straightforward narrative. The plot, while at times complex and detailed, relies on constant forward action interspersed with brief introspections from the main character. Although many characters are violently killed in the novel, the accounts are primarily second-hand and Henty describes the events in sparse detail. The novel focuses primarily on Harry's courage, self-determination, and pluck, and the events of the novel centre on his struggles and daring adventures.

== Themes ==
=== Nationalism ===
Like many of Henty's texts, In the Reign of Terror emphasises British nationalism and derides the French nation as weak, frivolous, and lacking in masculine strength and independence. Henty's novels often portray young protagonists who "retain their essential Britishness years after leaving Britain and their families." Harry, as a representative of British culture, is upstanding, courageous, tenacious, and determined in the face of hardship. The novel depicts the French Revolution in highly negative and conservative terms, emphasising the ever-increasing violence and chaos and introducing numerous secondary characters who hate the Revolution and its proponents. Supporters of the Revolution are portrayed as universally bloodthirsty and out of control, and the French nation as a whole is said to be descending into madness while Britain stands as a stalwart symbol of imperial strength. Henty's adventure novels "have been examined by a number of historians, all of whom agree that his books reflected and reinforced imperial sentiments," and nationalism is a common theme in his work.

=== Boyhood and Masculinity ===
Harry Sandwith is positioned as the paragon of British boyhood, combining physical strength and manly ruggedness with courage, modesty, and integrity. Harry engages in several boyish adventures while living at the St. Caux chateau: He heroically leaps to the aid of Jeanne and Virginie when they are attacked by a rabid dog, and he and Ernest succeed in killing the Demon Wolf, a monstrous wolf living in the forests of Dijon. The Marquis de St. Caux states that he hopes his sons will "acquire something of the manly independence of thought and action which distinguishes English boys," and Harry is often described in contrast to Ernest’s more refined, and therefore feminised, identity. The themes of boyhood and masculinity are also tied up with the nationalistic themes that run throughout the novel, and his position as the masculine rescuer of the St. Caux daughters can be read as the courageous British nation saving France from itself during the bloody and chaotic Revolution. This focus on masculinity and boyhood triumphs was common in Henty's novels, and "contemporary readers and subsequent critics alike have focused on Henty’s boy heroes, their adventures in distant locales, inevitable successes, rise in the Empire, and their triumphant return to England."

=== Class Divisions ===
The novel comments on the differences between the British and French structures of social class. The St. Caux family is part of the French nobility, while Harry is the son of a doctor and a member of a large family that often experiences financial difficulties in caring for all of the children. The contrast between British and French social classes is often directly addressed: the French class system is more deeply and strictly divided than the British, who are described as having less distinct class divisions. And in the historical setting of the French Revolution, the animosity between the aristocracy and the French peasantry is apparent – much of the St. Caux family are killed for the sake of their aristocratic status. Harry, himself a middle-class English boy, "sympathizes with the oppressed peasantry but tries to protect his adoptive noble French family from the terror." The theme of class divisions is threaded with nationalistic rhetoric: Harry’s father states that "the condition of the vast body of the French nation has been terrible," and that England, in contrast, has "long conquered our liberties."

== Reception ==
In the Reign of Terror was well received in its time and is one of Henty's more popular works. Contemporary reviews were positive: The Saturday Review writes, "Harry Sandwith, the Westminster boy, may fairly be said to beat Mr. Henty's record. His adventure will delight boys by the audacity and peril they depict. The story is one of Mr. Henty's best," and the Birmingham Post says, "The difficulties and perils Harry has to encounter bring out the heroic and steadfast qualities of a brave nature... It is an admirable boy's book." Today, Henty's historical novels are popular with homeschool children due to their emphasis on courage, integrity, modesty, and patriotism. They are also often criticised for their "hearty imperialism, undisguised racism, and jingoistic patriotism."
