= Ernest William Haslehust =

English landscape painter (1866–1949)

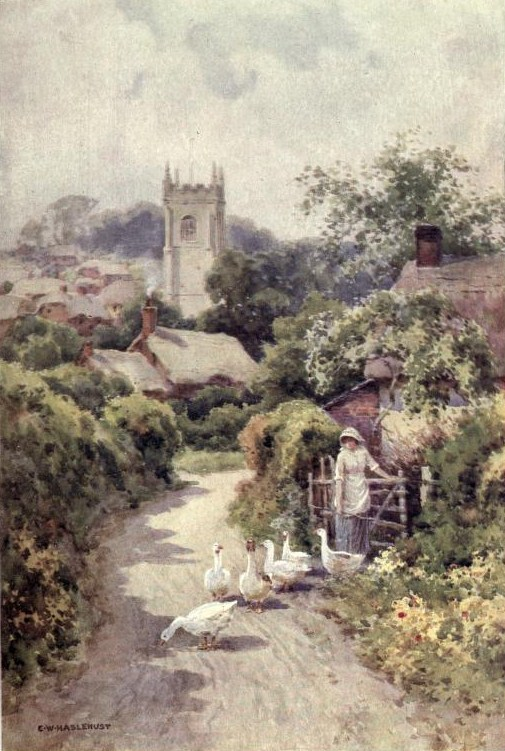
Bere Regis, Dorset (Watercolour, 1910)

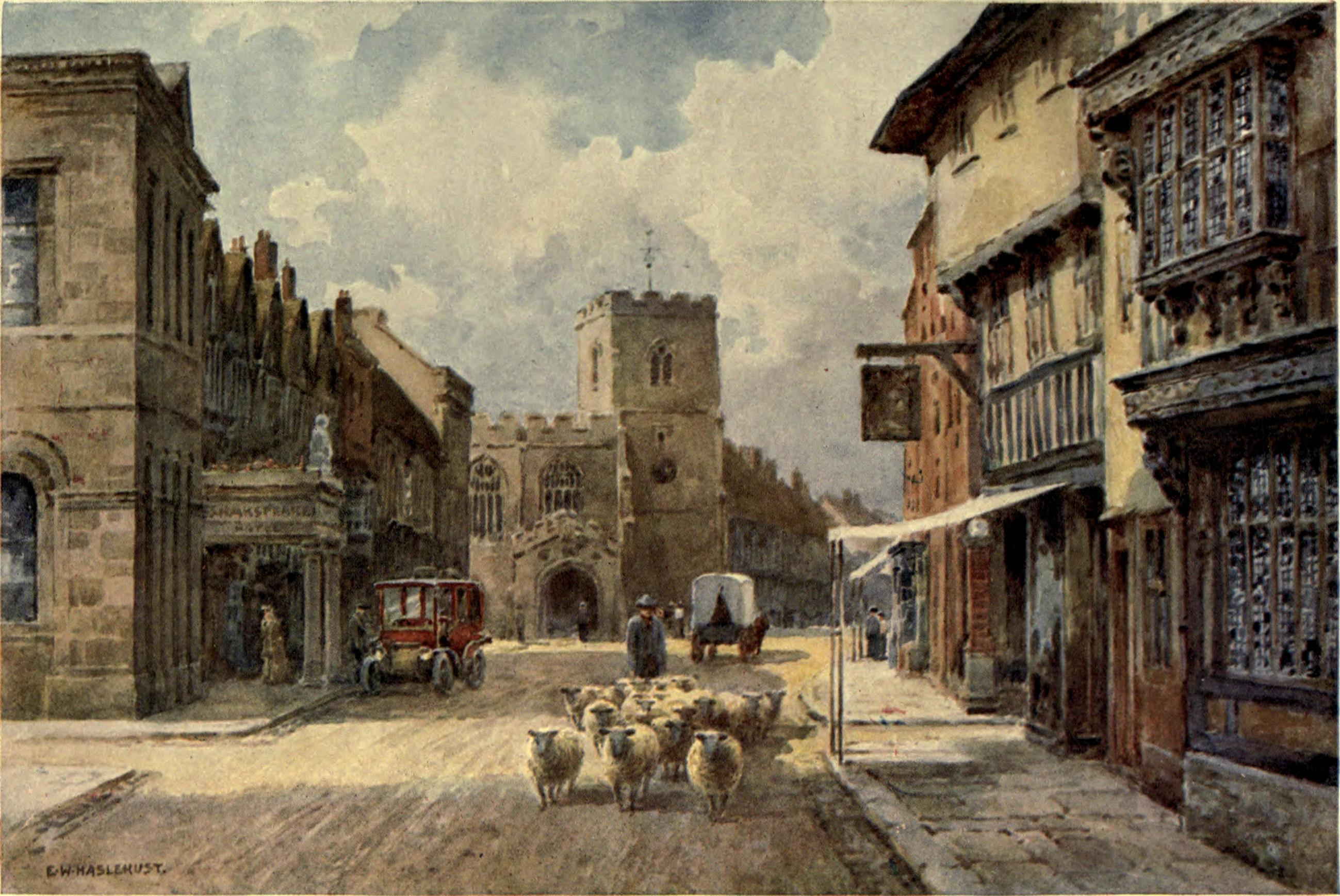
High Street, Stratford on Avon (1910)

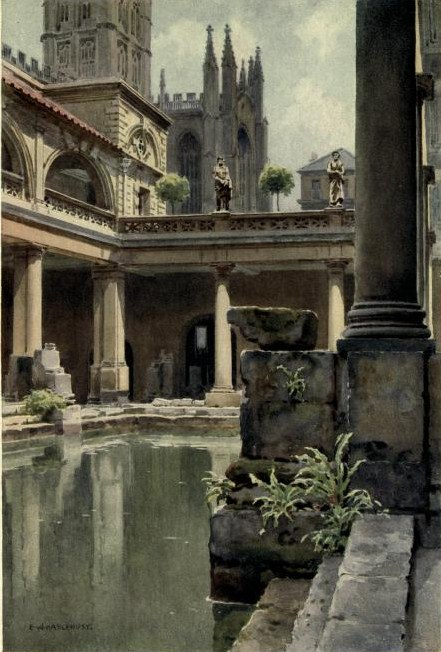
The Roman Bath, Bath, Somerset (1914)

Ernest William Haslehust (12 November 1866 – 3 July 1949) was an English landscape painter and book illustrator who worked in watercolours.

== Life and work ==
Haslehust was born in Walthamstow in Essex (now part of Greater London), the son of William Henry Haslehust, and studied at the Slade School of Fine Art in London under Alphonse Legros. He was a member of the Royal Institute of Painters in Water Colours (RI), Royal Society of British Artists (RBA), Royal West of England Academy (RWA) and Royal British Colonial Society of Artists (RBC), and exhibited regularly at many venues including the Royal Academy in London. He also designed posters for the LNER and LMS railway companies, and his art was featured in many magazines of the day including the Illustrated London News and The Tatler.

He was a prolific painter of British landscapes in watercolour. One book he worked on was I Wish I Could Paint (The Studio, London, 1945. 96 p., 4º) with the text by Percy Bradshaw. (Note: Demonstration lessons in Water-Colour. No. 36 in the How to Do It series by The Studio.)

== Books illustrated by Haslehust ==
Haslehust is perhaps best remembered for illustrating 36 volumes of the well-known "Beautiful England" series of travel books published by Blackie and Son Limited (see titles below). Those marked '$' in the series "Beautiful Scotland"; the others in "Beautiful England"

- Barwell, Noel. Cambridge (Blackie and Son, 1911).
- Benson, George. York (Dana Estes and Co Boston).
- Bradley, A. G. The English Lakes (Blackie and Son, 1910)
- Danks, William. Canterbury (Blackie and Son, 1910)
- Edwards, Charles and Bennett, J. H. E. Chester (Blackie and Son, 1911)
- Edwards, Charles. Our Beautiful Homeland: Hereford, Chester, Oxford, Warwick & Leamington (Gresham, Ca. 1920s)
- Eyre-Todd, George. Loch Lomond, Loch Katrine, and the Trossachs (Blackie and Son, 1922) $
- Geddie, John. Edinburgh (Blackie and Son, 1922) $
- Geddie, John. The Shores of Fife (Blackie and Son, 1922) $
- Geddie, John. The Scott Country (Blackie and Son, 1922) $
- Gilchrist, Murray. The Dukeries (Blackie and Son, 1913).
- Gilchrist, Murray. The Peak District London Blackie, 1911.
- Godfrey, Elizabeth. The New Forest (Blackie and Son, 1912).
- Heath, Sidney. The Cornish Riviera (Blackie and Son, 1911).
- Heath, Sidney. Winchester (Blackie and Son, 1911).
- Heath, Sidney. Exeter (Blackie and Son, 1912).
- Heath, Sidney. Bournemouth, Poole and Christchurch (Blackie and Son, 1915).
- Heath, Sidney. The Heart of Wessex (Blackie and Son).
- Heath, Sidney. Swanage and District (Blackie and Son, 1915).
- Higgins, Walter. Hastings and Neighbourhood (Blackie and Son, 1920)
- How, Frederick Douglas. Oxford (Blackie and Son, 1910).
- Jerrold, Walter. Shakespeare Land (Dana Estes & Co. Boston).
- Jerrold, Walter. Norwich and the Broads (Blackie and Son, 1910).
- Jerrold, Walter. Hampton Court (Blackie and Son, 1912)
- Jerrold, Walter. The Thames (Blackie and Son, 1910)
- Jerrold, Walter. Folkestone and Dover (Blackie and Son, 1920).
- Jerrold, Walter. The Heart of London (Blackie and Son, Ltd, 1924)
- Jerrold, Walter. Through London's highways (Blackie and Son, Ltd, 1924)
- Jerrold, Walter. In London's by-ways (Blackie and Son, Ltd, 1925)
- Jerrold, Walter. Rambles in Greater London (Blackie and Son, Ltd, 1925)
- Morley, George. Warwick and Leamington (New York: Dodge, ca. 1920).
- Nicklin, J. A. Dickens Land (Blackie and Son, 1911)
- Salmon, Arthur Leslie. Bath and Wells (New York Dodge Pub. Co., 1914).
- Salmon, Arthur Leslie. Dartmoor (Blackie and Son, 1913).
- Thomas, Edward. Windsor Castle (Dana Estes and Co. 1921).
- Thomas, Edward. The Isle of Wight (Blackie and Son, 1911).
- Thomas, Edward. In Pursuit of Spring (Thomas Nelson and Sons, 1914).

== See also ==
- Sidney Heath
- Walter Jerrold
