= Sidney Heath =

British artist

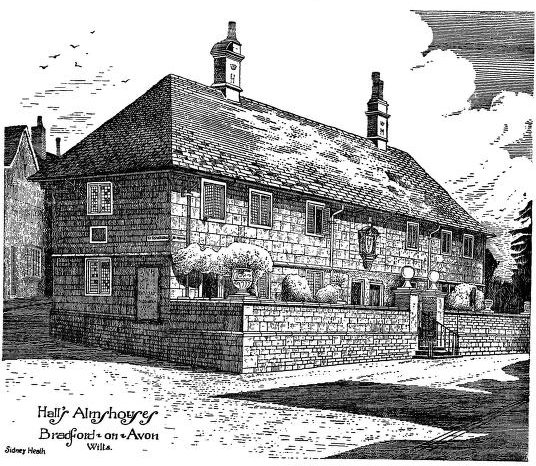
Hall's Almshouses, by Sidney Heath

Sidney Herbert Heath (1872 - ?) was a notable English landscape artist, illustrator and author of books on local topography, history and architecture. He specialised in drawings of old buildings.

He wrote several volumes for the "Beautiful England" series of travel books, illustrated by E W Haslehust, and published by Blackie and Son Limited (see below).

== Illustrated books ==
Written and illustrated by Heath

- Perkins, Thomas & Pentin, Herbet (Eds). Memorials of Old Dorset (London, Bemrose, 1907).
- Our Homeland Churches and how to Study them (The Homeland Association, 1907).
- The Romance of Symbolism and its Relationship to Church Ornament and Architecture (Francis Griffiths, 1909).
- The South Devon and Dorset Coast (T. Fisher Unwin, 1910).
- Old English Houses of Alms: a pictorial record with architectural and historical notes (London: F. Griffiths, 1910).
- The Story of Ford Abbey: from the earliest times to the present day (Francis Griffiths, 1911)
- Pilgrim Life in the Middle Ages (T. Fisher Unwin, 1911).
- A School History of Dorset (Dorset Education Committee, 1920).
- The Parts of a Manor House (George Philip & Son, 1928)
- The Parts of a Church (George Philip & Son, 1929).
- The Homes and Buildings of Other Days (George Philip & Son, 1929).
- Our Homeland Cathedrals (The Homeland Association, 1930).

Written by Heath, illustrated by E. W. Haslehust:

- The Cornish Riviera (Blackie and Son, 1911).
- Winchester (Blackie & Son, 1911).
- Exeter (Blackie & Son, 1912).
- Bournemouth, Poole and Christchurch (Blackie & Son, 1915).
- The Heart of Wessex (Blackie & Son).
- Swanage and District (Blackie & Son, 1915).

Illustrated by Heath:

- Brassington, William S. Shakespeare's Homeland (J. M. Dent & Co., 1903.

== See also ==
- E W Haslehust
