= With Kitchener in the Soudan =

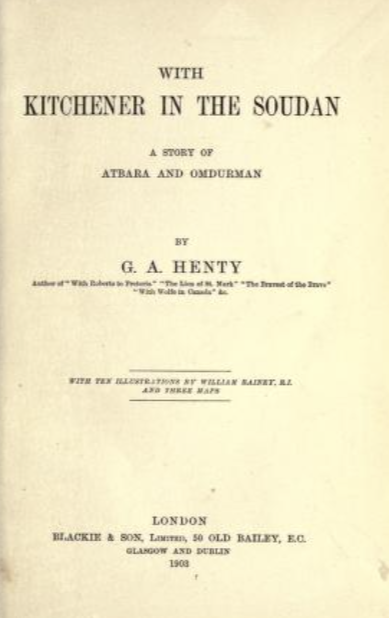
- Title page for With Kitchener in the Soudan (1903)
- Author: G. A. Henty
- Illustrator: William Rainey
- Language: English
- Genre: Adventure novel
- Publisher: Charles Scribner’s Sons, New York (1902). Blackie and Son Ltd., London (1903)
- Publication date: 1902
- Publication place: United Kingdom
- Media type: Print (hardcover)
- Preceded by: A Dash for Khartoum

With Kitchener in the Soudan; A Story of Atbara and Omdurman by British author G. A. Henty is an adventure novel set during the British military expedition under Lord Kitchener and the subsequent destruction of the Mahdi's followers during the Mahdist War (1881–1899). It was first published in 1902.

== Plot ==
Gregory Hilliard Hartley is a young man, brother to the heir of an English estate. When he marries a young lady lower on the social ladder than his father wished, he is expelled from his father's house. He soon travels to Egypt, due to his knowledge of Arabic, and obtains employment with a merchant firm. When the Dervishes attack and destroy his employer's warehouse, he joins the army under Hicks Pasha as an interpreter. The expedition is destroyed, and no news is heard of Gregory.

His wife lives in Cairo, uncertain of his fate. Years pass, and she brings up their young son, also named Gregory, and ensures that he is taught several native languages. When she dies, Gregory is left alone in the world, with a small bank account and a mysterious tin box only to be opened when he is certain of his father's death.

Gregory obtains a position as interpreter in the expedition under Lord Kitchener which is advancing into the Soudan to attack the Dervish forces. He endures many hardships and dangers in the great campaign, and gains high distinction, while continuing his search for his father. Soon, a discovery leads him to a clue, and the tin box, once opened, reveals a surprising discovery about his true identity.

== Characters ==
- Mr. Hartley: father of the main character
- Mrs. Hartley: mother of the main character
- Gregory Hilliard Hartley: main character
- Zaki: servant and friend
- Mahmud: commander of the Dervish forces
- Lord Kitchener: commander of the British forces

== Major themes ==
This is an example of a Victorian subgenre of adventure fiction that celebrated the British Empire and Imperial ideals. They were mostly aimed at schoolboys and were important in maintaining enthusiasm for the Empire. A common theme, shared by this book, is the threat to the Empire from a less civilised foe; in this case the self-proclaimed Mahdi, the prophesied redeemer of the Islamic world, and his followers, who had already inflicted severe defeats on British forces.

The hero, Gregory Hartley, is raised by his mother in a manner appropriate for creating an English Gentleman according to the standards of the time. In text, this is because "we may go back to England some day, and I should not at all like you to be less strong than others." This is mainly training for physical strength, by playing games and receiving fencing lessons, but also includes ensuring that his "manners were those of an Englishman", such as chivalry, wit, compassion and charity. He is described as having "much of the bearing and appearance of an English public school boy" but only "much" and not all of the bearing. Henty initially leaves open the possibility of Gregory becoming whole. Gregory lacks a proper public school education and so cannot normally be considered a genuine English gentleman. However, the fact that he is out in the Empire rather than the United Kingdom grants Gregory an exception to this rule.

As was common at the time of writing, Henty stereotypes the races in the story along martial lines, with the English as a physical and moral benchmark. The Egyptian peasants are written as sturdy but agricultural and not warlike. The black Sudanese, however, are "splendid fellows – they love fighting for fighting's sake. It is in their opinion the only worthy occupation for a man, and they have shown themselves worthy to fight for the side of our men." Henty qualifies this praise, however, by infantilising the Sudanese and making clear that they require English leadership and discipline to be most effective. The Sudanese and the Mahdist Dervishes are the most courageous and therefore have higher status, in the story, than the Egyptians, who are not far behind when led by the English. The English themselves are seen as too advanced to be included on this scale.

English moral superiority is established throughout the novel, such as when Gregory saves a woman from drowning and is captured as a result. The woman is revealed to be the wife of Gregory's captor, Mahmud, the Khalifa's son. Both Mahmud and, earlier, Gregory's Arab servant Zaki express surprise that Gregory would risk his life to save her. To Mahmud, Gregory explains English chivalry: "What I did, Emir, I believe any white officer who was a good swimmer would have done. No Englishman would see a woman drowning without making an effort to save her, if he had it in his power. As to the fact that she was not of the same race or religion, he would never give it a thought. It would be quite enough for him that she was a woman."

== Development history ==
The book was written in London and was based heavily on contemporary reports filed by newspaper correspondents.

== Literary significance and reception ==
This book was a sequel to Henty's own A Dash for Khartoum of 1892 in terms of setting.

Henty rarely included women in his works and, when he did, they were usually present only in relation to the main character. Annie Hartley in this novel is one of Henty's examples of a strong-willed woman, who raises her only son after her husband dies in battle.
