= The Cat of Bubastes =

Novel by G. A. Henty

The Cat of Bubastes, A Tale of Ancient Egypt
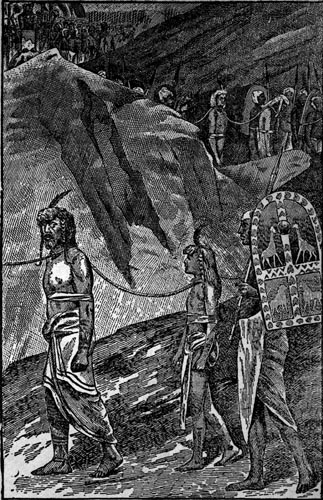
- Author: G.A. Henty
- Illustrator: John Reinhard Weguelin
- Language: English american
- Series: None
- Genre: Young adult novel
- Publisher: Blackie and Son Ltd., London
- Publication date: 3 September 1888 but dated 1889
- Publication place: Egypt
- Media type: Print (Hardcover)
- Pages: 352 pp

The Cat of Bubastes, A Tale of Ancient Egypt is an 1889 historical novel written for boys by British author G.A. Henty. It is the story of a young prince who becomes a slave when the Egyptians conquer his people, then is made a fugitive when his master accidentally kills a sacred cat. The book was illustrated by John Reinhard Weguelin, a notable Victorian painter.

== Setting ==
The novel takes place in the Middle East, particularly in Egypt, during the reign of Thotmes III.

== Plot ==
After his father, the king of the Rebu, is killed in battle with the Egyptian army and the Rebu nation is conquered by the Egyptians, the young prince Amuba is carried away as a captive to Egypt, along with his faithful charioteer, Jethro. In Thebes, Amuba becomes the servant and companion to Chebron, the son of Ameres, high priest of Osiris. The lads become involved in a mystery as they begin to uncover evidence of a murderous conspiracy within the ranks of the priesthood. However, before they are able to prevent it, they are forced to flee for their lives when they accidentally cause the death of the successor to the Cat of Bubastes, one of the most sacred animals in Egypt. With Jethro as their guide and protector, the boys make plans to escape from Egyptian territory and return to Amuba's homeland.

== Reception ==
The London Standard said that the story "affords Mr. Henty the opportunity of giving a few graphic and picturesque sketches of the inner life of the ancient Egyptians, their religion, their domestic and social customs, and their family life in town and country... The love interest in this charming story is, of course, subordinate to the more manly and exciting incidents, but it is not overlooked... The whole story is a vivid and attractive picture of Egyptian life, and the effect is heightened by a number of well-executed full-page illustrations."

Comparing the book to Henty's The Lion of St. Mark, the Bristol Mercury said, "Mr. Henty's characteristic style is seen to even better advantage. His picture of the life of the Egyptian people is the feature of the book, and forms a picturesque setting to a most fascinating tale."
