= G. A. Henty =

British novelist (1832 – 1902)

George Alfred Henty
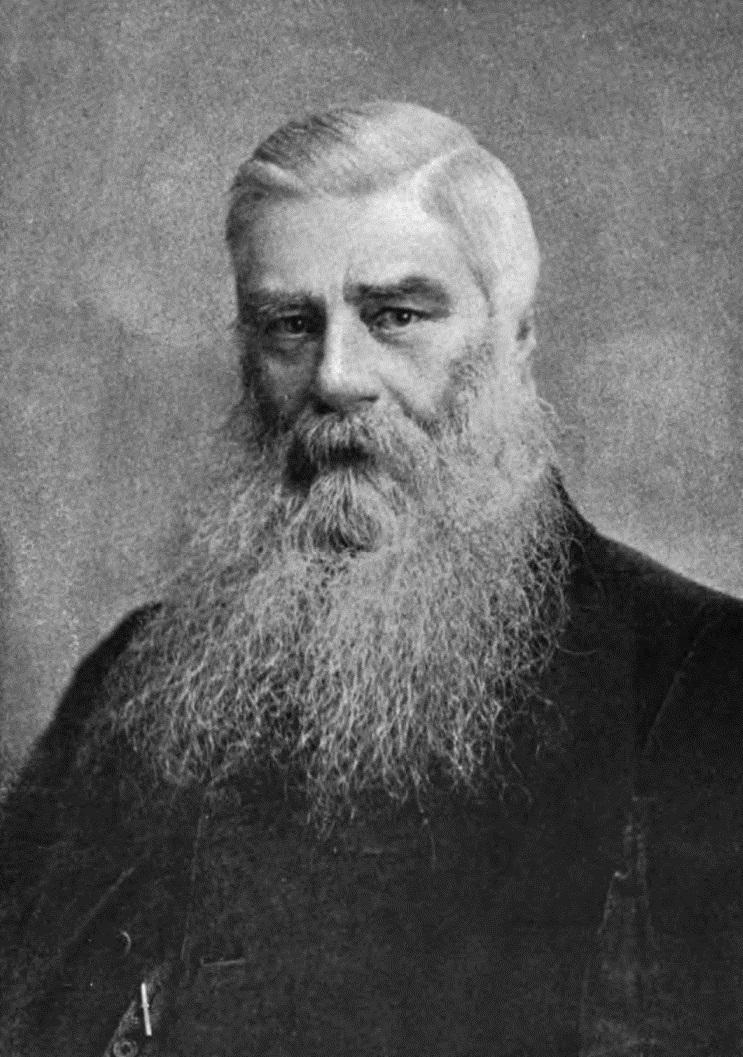
- Photo portrait by Elliott & Fry
- Born: 8 December 1832; Godmanchester, Huntingdonshire, England
- Died: 16 November 1902 (aged 69); Weymouth, Dorset, England
- Occupations: Fiction writer, war correspondent
- Writing career
- Period: Late 19th century
- Genre: Fiction

George Alfred Henty (8 December 1832 – 16 November 1902) was an English novelist and war correspondent. He is best known for his works of adventure fiction and historical fiction, including The Dragon & The Raven (1886), For The Temple (1888), Under Drake's Flag (1883) and In Freedom's Cause (1885).

== Biography ==
G. A. Henty was born and baptised in Godmanchester, near Huntingdon, but spent some of his childhood in Canterbury before his family moved to London. He was a sickly child who had to spend long periods in bed. (Note: Fenn notes that Henty himself wrote "I spent my boyhood, to the best of my recollection, in bed.) During his frequent illnesses he became an avid reader and developed a wide range of interests which he carried into adulthood. He attended Westminster School, London, as a half-boarder when he was fourteen, and later Gonville and Caius College, Cambridge, where he was a keen sportsman.

He left the university early without completing his degree to volunteer for the (Army) Hospital Commissariat of the Purveyors Department when the Crimean War began. He was sent to the Crimea and while there he witnessed the appalling conditions under which the British soldier had to fight. His letters home were filled with vivid descriptions of what he saw. His father was impressed by his letters and sent them to the Morning Advertiser newspaper which printed them. This initial writing success was a factor in Henty's later decision to accept the offer to become a special correspondent, the early name for journalists now better known as war correspondents.

Shortly before resigning from the army as a captain in 1859 he married Elizabeth Finucane. The couple had four children. Elizabeth died in 1865 after a long illness and shortly after her death Henty began writing articles for the Standard newspaper. In 1866 the newspaper sent him as their special correspondent to report on the Austro-Italian War where he met Giuseppe Garibaldi. He went on to cover the 1868 British punitive expedition to Abyssinia, the Franco-Prussian War, the Ashanti War, the Carlist Rebellion in Spain and the Turco-Serbian War. He also witnessed the opening of the Suez Canal and travelled to Palestine, Russia and India.

Henty was a strong supporter of the British Empire all his life; according to literary critic Kathryn Castle: "Henty ... exemplified the ethos of the [British Empire], and glorified [sic] in its successes". Henty's ideas about politics were influenced by writers such as Sir Charles Dilke and Thomas Carlyle.

Henty once related in an interview how his storytelling skills grew out of tales told after dinner to his children. He wrote his first children's book, Out on the Pampas in 1868, naming the book's main characters after his children. The book was published by Griffith and Farran in November 1870 with a title page date of 1871. While most of the 122 books he wrote were for children and published by Blackie and Son of London, he also wrote adult novels, non-fiction such as The March to Magdala and Those Other Animals, short stories for the likes of The Boy's Own Paper and edited the Union Jack, a weekly boy's magazine.

Henty was "the most popular Boy's author of his day." Blackie, who published his children's fiction in the UK, and W. G. Blackie estimated in February 1952 that they were producing about 150,000 Henty books a year at the height of his popularity, (Note: It should be remembered that at the time, a popular adult novel might sell as many as 5,000 copies.) and stated that their records showed they had produced over three and a half million Henty books. He further estimated that considering the US and other overseas authorised and pirated editions, a total of 25 million was not impossible. Arnold notes this estimate and that there have been further editions since that estimate was made.

His children's novels typically revolved around a boy or young man living in troubled times. These ranged from the Punic War to more recent conflicts such as the Napoleonic Wars or the American Civil War. Henty's heroes – which occasionally included young ladies – are uniformly intelligent, courageous, honest and resourceful with plenty of 'pluck' yet are also modest. These themes have made Henty's novels popular today among many conservative Christians and homeschoolers.

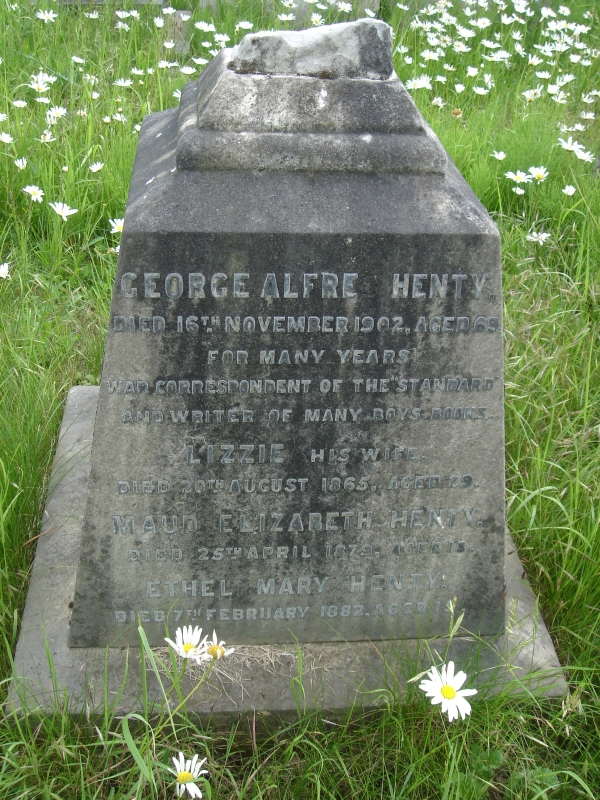
Funerary monument, Brompton Cemetery, London

Henty usually researched his novels by ordering several books on the subject he was writing on from libraries, and consulting them before beginning writing. Some of his books were written about events (such as the Crimean War) that he witnessed himself; hence, these books are written with greater detail as Henty drew upon his first-hand experiences of people, places, and events.

On 16 November 1902, Henty died aboard his yacht in Weymouth Harbour, Dorset, leaving unfinished his last novel, By Conduct and Courage, which was completed by his son Captain C.G. Henty.

Henty is buried in Brompton Cemetery, London.

== Influence ==
G. A. Henty's commercial popularity encouraged other writers to try writing juvenile adventure stories in his style; "Herbert Strang", Henry Everett McNeil, Percy F. Westerman and Captain Frederick Sadleir Brereton all wrote novels in "the Henty tradition", often incorporating then-contemporary themes such as aviation and First World War combat. By the 1930s, however, interest in Henty's work was declining in Britain, and hence few children's writers there looked to his work as a model.

== Bibliography ==
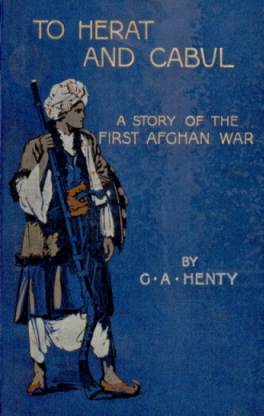
The cover of the 1902 first edition of To Herat and Cabul, A Story of the First Afghan War by G. A. Henty and illustrations by Charles A. Sheldon, published by Blackie and Son Ltd., London.

Henty wrote 122 works of historical fiction and all first editions had the date printed at the foot of the title page. Several short stories published in book form are included in this total, with the stories taken from previously published full-length novels. The dates given below are those printed at the foot of the title page of the very first editions in the United Kingdom. It is a common misconception that American Henty titles were published before those of the UK. All Henty titles bar one were published in the UK before those of America.

The simple explanation for this error of judgement is that Charles Scribner's Sons of New York dated their Henty first editions for the current year. The first UK editions published by Blackie were always dated for the coming year, to have them looking fresh for Christmas. The only Henty title published in book form in America before the UK book was In the Hands of the Cave-Dwellers dated 1900 and published by Harper of New York. This title was published in book form in the UK in 1903, although the story itself had already been published in England prior to the first American edition, in The Boy's Own Annual.

=== Misattribution ===
A book published in 1884 in the "Fireside Henty Series" called Forest and Frontier was discovered to be by Thomas M. Newson.

=== UK and US availability ===
In the late 1990s, a number of American publishers, such as Polyglot Press (Philadelphia, PA), PrestonSpeed, and the Lost Classics Book Company, began reprinting Henty's books and advocating their usage for conservative homeschoolers. Reprints of all Henty's works are available from modern day British and American publishers. One such publisher and major modern advocate of Henty is the American scientist (biochemist), homeschool curriculum publisher, and Oregon State Senator Arthur B. Robinson, who promotes the use of Henty's books as a supplement to his self-teaching homeschool curriculum.

== Controversial views ==
Henty's views have been contentious; some writers have accused Henty's novels of being aggressively and obstinately nationalist and reactionary in such books as True to the Old Flag (1885) which features a Loyalist protagonist fighting in the American War of Independence, and In the Reign of Terror (1888) and No Surrender! A Tale of the Rising in La Vendée (1900) which are strongly hostile to the French Revolution.

Henty's novel With Lee in Virginia has a protagonist who fights on the side of the Confederacy against the Union.

Henty's popularity amongst homeschoolers is not without controversy. Quoting from the chapter of By Sheer Pluck called "The Negro Character" ("like children"), American television host and political commentator Rachel Maddow called Henty's writings "spectacularly racist". Carpenter and Pritchard note that while "Henty's work is indeed full of racial (and class) stereotypes", he sometimes created sympathetic ethnic minority characters, such as the Indian servant who marries a white woman in With Clive in India, and point out Henty admired the Turkish Empire. Some even accuse Henty of holding blacks in utter contempt, and this is expressed in novels such as By Sheer Pluck: A Tale of the Ashanti War and A Roving Commission, or, Through the Black Insurrection at Hayti. Kathryne S. McDorman states Henty disliked blacks and also, in Henty's fiction, that "Boers and Jews were considered equally ignoble".

In By Sheer Pluck: A Tale of the Ashanti War, Mr. Goodenough, an entomologist remarks to the hero: “They [Negroes] are just like children ... They are always either laughing or quarrelling. They are good-natured and passionate, indolent, but will work hard for a time; clever up to a certain point, densely stupid beyond. The intelligence of an average negro is about equal to that of a European child of ten years old. ... They are fluent talkers, but their ideas are borrowed. They are absolutely without originality, absolutely without inventive power. Living among white men, their imitative faculties enable them to attain a considerable amount of civilization. Left alone to their own devices they retrograde into a state little above their native savagery.”

In the Preface to his novel A Roving Commission (1900) Henty claims "the condition of the negroes in Hayti has fallen to the level of that of the savage African tribes" and argues "unless some strong white power should occupy the island and enforce law and order" this situation will not change. In the novel Facing Death: A Tale of the Coal Mines Henty comes down against strikes and has the working class hero of the novel, Jack Simpson, quell a strike among coal miners.

A review by Deirdre H. McMahon in Studies of the Novel in 2010 refers to his novels as jingoist and racist and states that during the previous decade "Numerous reviews in right-wing and conservative Christian journals and websites applaud Henty's texts as model readings and thoughtful presents for children, especially boys. These reviews often ignore Henty's racism by packaging his version of empire as refreshingly heroic and patriotic."

In 1888, on the bookjacket for Captain Bayley's Heir, The Times wrote that Henty's character in With Lee in Virginia, "bravely proving his sympathy with the slaves of brutal masters" escapes through "the devotion of a black servant and of a runaway slave whom he had assisted". The reviewer recommended the book.

== List of titles ==
Titles	Title Page Dates (Note: Almost all Blackie 1st Editions of Henty were published in the year prior to their title page date. This was a common marketing tactic at the time as books remained "fresh" for longer. See Appendix VII of Newbolt.)	Publication Dates (Note: Except where indicated the publication dates are drawn from Newbolt's list of Publication Dates for Blackie Editions.)
A Search for a Secret	1867	
The March to Magdala	1868	
All But Lost, Volumes I, II and III	1869	
Out on the Pampas: The Young Settlers	1871 (Note: This was Henty's first book for children. The four main characters are named after his own children. It was published in 1870 even though the title page says 1871. This was a common marketing tactic at the time.)	
The Young Franc-Tireurs and Their Adventure in the Franco-Prussian War	1872	
The March to Coomassie	1874	
The Young Buglers, A Tale of the Peninsular War	1880	
The Cornet of Horse: A Tale of Marlborough's Wars	1881	
In Times of Peril: A Tale of India	1881	
Facing Death, The Hero of the Vaughan Pit – A Tale of the Coal Mines	1882	31 May 1882
Winning His Spurs: A Tale of the Crusades (aka Boy Knight)	1882	
Friends Though Divided: A Tale of the Civil War	1883	
Jack Archer: A Tale of the Crimea	1883	
Under Drake's Flag: A Tale of the Spanish Main	1883	31 August 1882
By Sheer Pluck: A Tale of the Ashanti War	1884	28 September 1883
With Clive in India: The Beginnings of an Empire	1884	24 September 1883
In Freedom's Cause: A Story of Wallace and Bruce	1885	16 July 1884
St. George For England: A Tale of Cressy and Poitiers	1885	27 August 1884
True to the Old Flag: A Tale of the American War of Independence	1885	2 August 1884
The Young Colonists: A Tale of the Zulu and Boer Wars	1885	
The Dragon and the Raven, or The Days of King Alfred	1886	2 May 1885
For Name and Fame: To Cabul with Roberts	1886	2 May 1885
The Lion of the North: A Tale of Gustavus Adolphus and the Wars of Religion	1886	19 August 1885
Through the Fray: A Tale of the Luddite Riots	1886	5 September 1885
Yarns on the Beach: A Bundle of Tales	1886	15 September 1885
The Bravest of the Brave, or, With Peterborough in Spain	1887	1 June 1886
A Final Reckoning: A Tale of Bush Life in Australia	1887	8 June 1886
The Sovereign Reader: Scenes from the Life and Reign of Queen Victoria	1887	26 August 1887
The Young Carthaginian, A Story of the Time of Hannibal	1887	8 June 1886
With Wolfe in Canada: The Winning of a Continent	1887	18 May 1886
Bonnie Prince Charlie: A Tale of Fontenoy and Culloden	1888	6 June 1887
For the Temple: A Tale of the Fall of Jerusalem	1888	19 August 1887
Gabriel Allen M.P.	1888	
In the Reign of Terror: The Adventures of a Westminster Boy	1888	8 July 1887
Orange and Green: A Tale of the Boyne and Limerick	1888	2 July 1887
Sturdy and Strong: How George Andrews Made His Way	1888	27 July 1887
Captain Bayley's Heir: A Tale of the Gold Fields of California	1889	15 August 1888
The Cat of Bubastes: A Tale of Ancient Egypt	1889	3 September 1888
The Curse of Carne's Hold: A Tale of Adventure, Volumes I and II	1889	
The Lion of St. Mark: A Story of Venice in the Fourteenth Century	1889	29 February 1888
The Plague Ship	(1889)	
Tales of Daring and Danger, Five Short Stories	1890	20 July 1889
By Pike and Dyke: A Tale of the Rise of the Dutch Republic	1890	7 August 1889
One of the 28th: A Tale of Waterloo	1890	8 August 1889
With Lee in Virginia, A Story of the American Civil War	1890	8 August 1889
The Boy Knight: A Tale of the Crusades (the American title for Winning His Spurs)	1891	
By England's Aid: The Freeing of the Netherlands, 1585–1604	1891	14 June 1890
By Right of Conquest: With Cortez in Mexico	1891	3 October 1890
Chapter of Adventures: Through the Bombardment of Alexandria aka The Young Midshipman (USA)	1891	14 June 1890
A Hidden Foe, Volumes I and II	1891	
Maori and Settler: A Tale of the New Zealand War	1891	15 July 1890
Those Other Animals	(1891)	
The Dash For Khartoum: A Tale of the Nile Expedition	1892	14 July 1891
Held Fast for England: A Tale of the Siege of Gibraltar (1779–83)	1892	1 August 1891
The Ranche in the Valley	(1892)	
Redskin and Cowboy: A Tale of the Western Plains	1892	14 July 1891
Beric the Briton: A Story of the Roman Invasion	1893	22 June 1892
Condemned as a Nihilist: A Story of Escape from Siberia	1893	21 June 1892
In Greek Waters: A Story of the Grecian War of Independence (1821–1827)	1893	29 June 1892
Rujub, the Juggler, Volumes I, II and III	1893	
Dorothy's Double: The Story of a Great Deception, Volumes I, II and III	1894	
A Jacobite Exile: Being the Adventures of a Young Englishman in the Service of Charles XII of Sweden	1894	13 June 1893
Saint Bartholomew's Eve: A Tale of the Huguenot Wars	1894	13 June 1893
Through the Sikh War: A Tale of the Conquest of the Punjab	1894	13 June 1893
In the Heart of the Rockies: A Story of Adventure in Colorado	1895	19 July 1894
When London Burned: A Story of Restoration Times and the Great Fire	1895	4 August 1894
Woman of the Commune: A Tale of Two Sieges of Paris (aka Cuthbert Hartington, A Girl of the Commune,Two Sieges and Two Sieges of Paris	1895	
Wulf The Saxon: A Story of the Norman Conquest	1895	8 May 1894
A Knight of the White Cross: A Tale of the Siege of Rhodes	1896	13 June 1895
Through Russian Snows: A Story of Napoleon's Retreat from Moscow	1896	14 August 1895
The Tiger of Mysore: A Story of the War with Tippoo Saib	1896	12 September 1895
At Agincourt: A Tale of the White Hoods of Paris	1897	27 June 1896
On the Irrawaddy: A Story of the First Burmese War	1897	13 August 1896
The Queen's Cup, A Novel, Volumes I, II and III	1897	
With Cochrane the Dauntless: A Tale of the Exploits of Lord Cochrane	1897	9 June 1896
Colonel Thorndyke's Secret (aka The Brahmin's Treasure (USA))	1898	
A March on London: Being a Story of Wat Tyler's Insurrection	1898	15 June 1897
With Frederick the Great: A Tale of the Seven Years War	1898	26 August 1897
With Moore at Corunna: A Tale of the Peninsular War	1898	22 May 1897
Among Malay Pirates; A Tale of Adventure and Peril	(1899)	
On the Spanish Main: A Tale of Cuba and the Buccaneers	(1899)	
At Aboukir and Acre: A Story of Napoleon's Invasion of Egypt	1899	28 July 1898
Both Sides the Border: A Tale of Hotspur and Glendower	1899	28 June 1898
The Golden Cañon and The Stone Chest, or The Secret of Cedar Island, (The Stone Chest is a filler title, not by Henty) (2-in-1 book)	1899	
The Lost Heir	1899	
Under Wellington's Command: A Tale of the Peninsular War	1899	2 June 1898
In the Hands of the Cave Dwellers	1900	18 July 1902
No Surrender! A Tale of the Rising in La Vendée	1900	24 August 1899
A Roving Commission, or, Through the Black Insurrection at Hayti	1900	11 July 1899
Won by the Sword: A Story of the Thirty Years War	1900	1 June 1899
In the Irish Brigade: A Tale of War in Flanders and Spain	1901	23 May 1900
John Hawke's Fortune: A Story of Monmouth's Rebellion	1901	
Out With Garibaldi: A Story of the Liberation of Italy	1901	15 August 1900
Queen Victoria: Scenes from her Life and Reign	1901	
With Buller in Natal: A Born Leader	1901	13 July 1900
At the Point of the Bayonet: A Tale of the Mahratta War	1902	6 April 1901
A Soldier's Daughter	1902	
To Herat and Cabul, A Story of the First Afghan War	1902	28 June 1901
With Roberts to Pretoria: A Tale of the South African War	1902	15 August 1901
The Treasure of the Incas: A Tale of Adventure in Peru	1903	23 June 1902
With Kitchener in the Soudan, A Story of Atbara and Omdurman	1903	17 May 1902
With the British Legion: A Story of the Carlist Wars	1903	2 August 1902
Through Three Campaigns: A Story of Chitral, Tirah, and Ashantee	1904	6 May 1903
With the Allies to Pekin: A Story of the Relief of the Legations	1904	29 May 1903
Gallant Deeds, Five Short Stories	1905	
By Conduct and Courage: A Story of Nelson's Days	1905	15 July 1904
In the Hands of the Malays	1905	
Among the Bushrangers from A Final Reckoning	1906	
Indian Raid, An from Redskin and Cowboy	1906	
Cast Ashore from With Clive in India	1906	
Charlie Marryat from With Clive in India	1906	
Cornet Walter from Orange and Green	1906	
A Highland Chief from In Freedom's Cause	1906	
The Two Prisoners from A Soldier's Daughter	1906	
The Young Captain from With Clive in India	1906	

== Adaptation ==
There is one known instance of a book title by Henty having been filmed, along with eleven audio theater productions by Heirloom Audio in their series "The Extraordinary Adventures of G. A. Henty": Under Drake's Flag, With Lee in Virginia, In the Reign of Terror, The Cat of Bubastes, Beric the Briton, The Dragon and the Raven, Wulf the Saxon, Captain Bayley's Heir In Freedom's Cause, St. Bartholomew's Eve, and For the Temple. Heirloom Audio's productions have featured several well-known actors, including Golden Globe winner Joanne Froggatt of Downton Abbey and Billy Boyd of The Lord of the Rings.

Heirloom Audio was founded by Illinois businessman Bill Heid, who said of Henty, "He took you to places that had great historical significance. It's historical fiction, yet there's very little fiction." Heid said of the characters portrayed in Henty's books and Heirloom Audio's productions, "Who's a real hero? Jay Cutler or Aaron Rodgers, or Francis Drake? Who had the guts, the belief in God's sovereignty? I want to tell the stories that young people think, 'I could imagine doing something like that.' I want them to dream big. There was a time in our country we really had big dreams, thought we could do big things. For some reason, we don't talk like that, take risks like that."

Heid added that too often in schools, "history becomes kind of a data dump, dead guys and dates." But with Henty, "History is anything but boring. It's amazing. William Wallace was a real person, had real struggles of his own. He had hopes and dreams and ambitions, struggles like anyone else, doubts and flaws."

Film

A Final Reckoning (1929), American, B&W: Serial/24 reels

Directed by Ray Taylor.
Cast: Frank Clark [Jim Whitney], Newton House, Louise Lorraine, Jay Wilsey, Edmund Cobb.
Universal Pictures Corporation production; distributed by Universal Pictures Corporation.
Scenario by Basil Dickey and George Morgan, from a novel by George Alfred Henty.
Cinematography by Frank Redman.

Twelve episodes (two reels each): [1] "A Treacherous Friend," released 15 April 1929. / Standard 35mm spherical 1.37:1 format. / [?] Website-IMDb lists the release date of the first episode as 15 April 1928.

Audio Theatre Productions

- Under Drake's Flag (2013), Heirloom Audio Productions
- In Freedom's Cause (2014), Heirloom Audio Productions
- With Lee in Virginia, Heirloom Audio Productions
- In the Reign of Terror, Heirloom Audio Productions
- The Cat of Bubastes, Heirloom Audio Productions
- Beric the Briton, Heirloom Audio Productions
- The Dragon and the Raven, Heirloom Audio Productions
- Captain Bayley's Heir, Heirloom Audio Productions
- Wulf the Saxon, Heirloom Audio Productions
