= With Lee in Virginia =

1890 book by G.A. Henty

With Lee in Virginia, A Story of the American Civil War
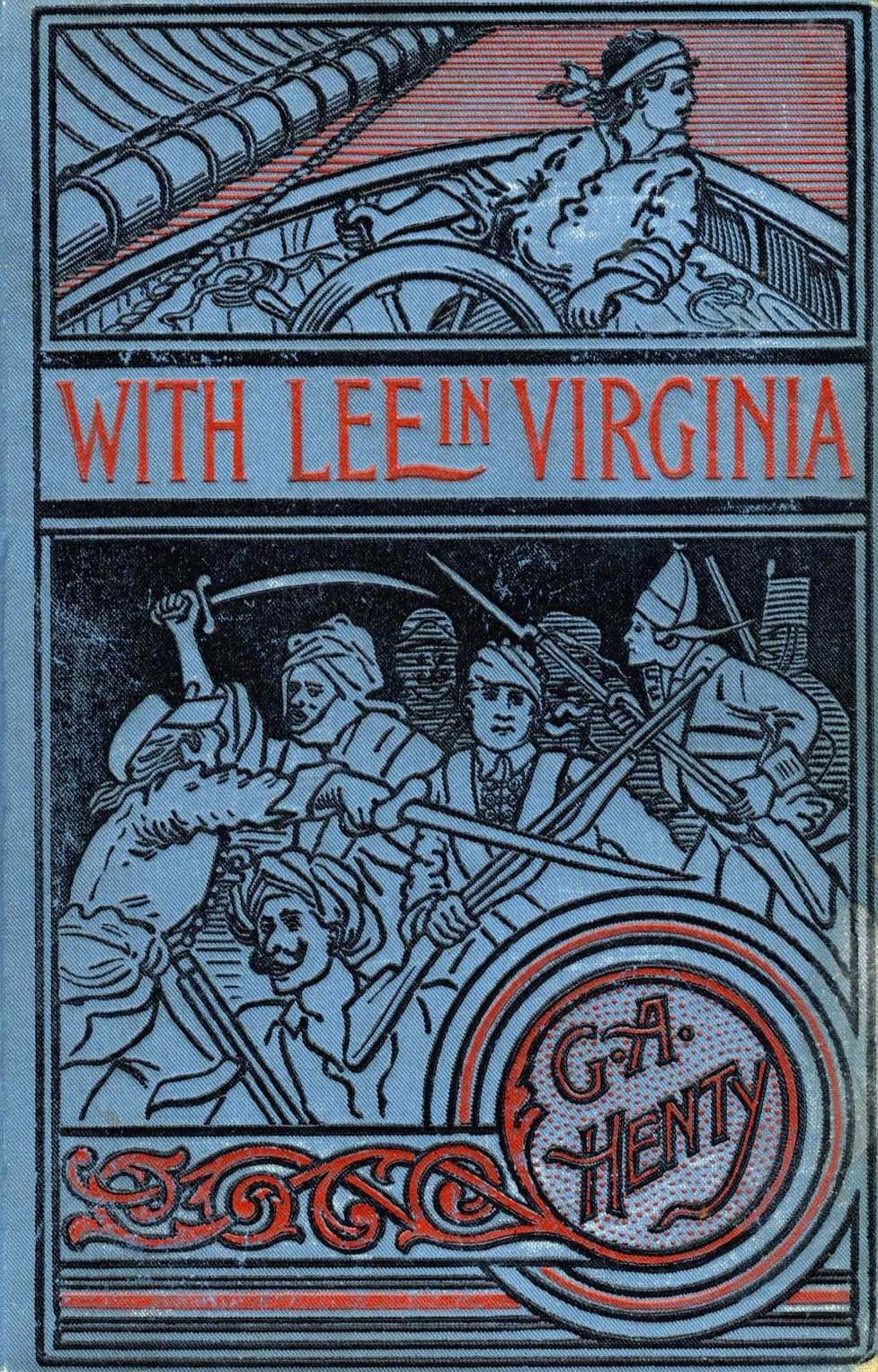
- Cover of 1899 edition, published by A. L. Burt, New York.
- Author: G.A. Henty
- Illustrator: Gordon Browne
- Language: English
- Genre: Historical novel
- Publisher: Blackie and Son Ltd., London
- Publication date: 1890
- Publication place: United Kingdom
- Media type: Print (Hardcover)

With Lee in Virginia, A Story of the American Civil War (1890) is a book by British author G.A. Henty. It was published by Blackie and Son Ltd, London. Henty's character, Vincent Wingfield, fights for the Confederate States of America, even though he is against slavery. As suggested by the title, he is primarily with the Army of Northern Virginia. Henty's novel has been cited by some literary historians as an example of British right-wingers' sympathy for the Confederate cause; discussing With Lee in Virginia, Jeffrey Richards cites the book as "significantly pro-Southern". Henty defends slavery throughout the novel, stating although slavery was capable of "abominable" cruelty under brutal masters, "..taken all in all, the negroes on a well-ordered estate, under kind masters, were probably a happier class of people than the laborers upon any estate in Europe." At the novel's end, Henty has the Wingfield family's former slaves return and continue working for their former owners:

The negroes, however, for the most part remained steadily working on the estate. A few wandered away, but their places were easily filled; for the majority of the freed slaves very soon discovered that their lot was a far harder one than it had been before, and that freedom so suddenly given was a curse rather than a blessing to them.

Richards cites the novel as an example of Henty's belief in the "incapacity" of blacks and notes that With Lee In Virginia argues that "a system of slavery is acceptable so long as the slave owners treat their slaves decently and humanely". Nathaniel Cadle claims With Lee in Virginia's plot works to "romanticize and oversimplify the relationship between white Confederate slave owners and their black chattel."

The book has been lauded by the right-wing, Neo-Confederate magazine Southern Partisan, who described With Lee in Virginia as "the sort of book Southern Partisan readers ought to pass on to their own sons. The politics of sectional conflict aren't oversimplified, but the bias is one Southern Partisan readers are likely to applaud".

== Adaptation ==
The book was adapted into an audio theater production in 2015, starring the voices of Kirk Cameron, Sean Astin, and Chris Anthony.
