= Blackie and Son =

Publishing house

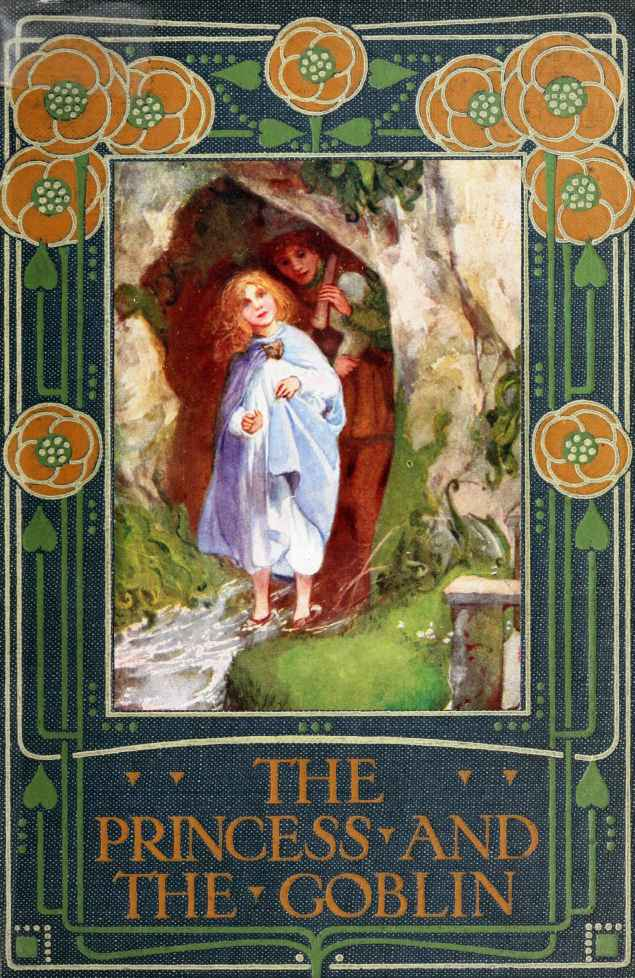
The Princess and the Goblin cover of the edition published by Blackie & Son, 1911.

Blackie & Son was a publishing house in Glasgow, Scotland, and London, England, from 1809 to 1991.

== History ==
The firm was founded as a bookseller in 1809 by John Blackie (1782–1874) as a partnership with two others and was known as 'Blackie, Fullarton and Company'. It began printing in 1819, using the skill and equipment of Edward Khull. It moved to Glasgow around 1830 and had premises at 8 Clyde Street facing the River Clyde. Following the retirement of Fullarton the company was renamed 'Blackie and Son' in 1831, remaining in the Clyde Street property, and becoming a public limited company in 1890. Later on, the business moved its Glasgow office to 17 Stanhope Street, and also opened offices at 5 South College Street in Edinburgh and 16/18 William IV Street, Charing Cross, London. The company also opened offices in Canada and India. It ceased publishing in 1991.

Blackie and Son initially published books sold by subscription, including religious texts and reference books. Later the firm published single volumes, particularly school-level educational texts and children's books, taking advantage of compulsory education from 1870. It also published "finely printed 'toy' and 'reward' books" (the latter being "intended for presentation as prizes to pupils in day and Sunday schools").

In 1893 Blackie and Son appointed Talwin Morris as the firm's art director and book designer. During his tenure, until his death in 1911, Morris was "responsible for the first integrated and visually homogenised approach to the mass production of easily affordable books" for any British publisher. He also designed books for Gresham Publishing, a subsidiary of Blackie and Son.

Blackie published G. A. Henty's historical adventure books for boys (e.g. With Kitchener in the Soudan and With Lee in Virginia) which were very popular in the British Empire in the later 19th century; Henty wrote 122 books including adult novels.

From 1920, under the guidance of the Cambridge-trained engineer and mathematician, Frederick Bisacre, who became a Blackie and Son partner and subsequently its chairman, the firm began to publish a scientific list "at the cutting edge of research" and which would become the "strongest list in the area" from any British commercial publisher.

Blackie published the many Flower Fairy books of Cicely Mary Barker beginning in 1923. From the 1950s onwards it published The Kennett Library, a graded series of classics retold for schools including: Kidnapped, Little Women, Westward Ho!, The Black Arrow, Wuthering Heights and Ben-Hur. From 1960 to 1991, Blackie published over 130 "Topsy and Tim" titles by Jean and Gareth Adamson.

In 1902, Walter Blackie commissioned Hill House on a plot in Helensburgh to the West of Glasgow. The architect was Charles Rennie Mackintosh, a friend of Talwin Morris. The house is regarded as one of Mackintosh's finest works.

== Book series ==
The following is a select listing. Further series are listed here in the Blackie Archives at Glasgow University Library.

- Anytime Series
- Authors in Their Age
- Beautiful Colour Books (Cicely Mary Barker)
- Beautiful England
- Beautiful Ireland
- Beautiful Poems Series
- Beautiful Scotland
- Beautiful Switzerland
- Blackie's Books For Boys And Girls Series
- Blackie's Books for Girls
- Blackie's Coloured-Picture Story Readers for Infants
- Blackie's Comprehensive School Series
- Blackie's Crown Library
- Blackie's Easy to Read Story Book Series
- Blackie's English Classics
- Blackie's English School Texts
- Blackie's English Texts (commonly subtitled: Highways and Byways of English Literature)
- Blackie's Famous Books
- Blackie's Famous Books for Boys and Girls
- Blackie's Flying Series
- Blackie's French Plays
- Blackie's German Texts
- Blackie's Graded Story Readers
- Blackie's Illustrated Latin Series
- Blackie's Infant Bookshelf
- Blackie's Library of Famous Books
- Blackie's Limp Leather Library
- Blackie's Modern Language Series
- Blackie's Scripture Books
- Blackie's Smaller English Classics
- Blackie's Sports Series
- Blackie's Standard English Classics
- Blackie's Star Classics
- Blackie’s Story Book Readers
- Blackie's Two Shilling Series of Reward Books (commonly referred to as: Reward Books)
- Blackie's Travel Library
- Books Illustrated in Colour by Cicely M. Barker
- The Boys' Library
- Brave Men Series
- The Casket Library
- Castle Library
- Children's Classics
- Chosen Books
- Cock Robin Books
- Continuous Readings from Great Authors
- The Crusader Series
- The Enterprise Library
- Graduated Stories
- Great Achievements Series
- Great Endeavour
- The Imperial Library (AKA Blackie's Imperial Library)
- Junior School Library
- The Kennett Library
- The Kingfisher Books
- Little French Classics
- The London Bells Series
- The Minerva Poets
- Myra Dakins School Series
- Nature-Story Picture Books
- The New Henty Library (later reissued as: New Popular Edition)
- The New Popular Henty
- The Newton Readers
- Nursery Series by John Hassall
- Order of Merit Series
- Our Beautiful Homeland Series
- The Pagoda Readers
- The Palmerston Readers
- The Peak Library
- The Picture Shakespeare
- The Pinnacle Library
- The Pioneer Library
- Pioneers of Empire
- The Plain Text Poets
- The Plain Text Shakespeare
- Poetry Quest: A Contemporary Poetry Series for Schools
- The Rambler Nature Books
- Rambles Among Our Industries
- The Realm of Reading
- The Red Letter Library
- The Red Letter Poets
- The Red Letter Shakespeare
- Retold for Little Folk Series
- Scripture Stories for Children
- Services Library
- Stories Old and New
- Student Drama Series
- The Student's Physics
- Theodora Wilson Wilson's Bible Stories (AKA Wilson's Bible Stories)
- Tiny Tots Series: Dainty Little Books for Dainty Little Folk
- Topics in Modern History Series
- Triumphs of Enterprise Series
- True Adventure Series
- The Useful Hints Series of Household Management Books
- Vere Foster's Water-Colour Series (also known as: Vere Foster's Water-Color Series)
- The Victorian Era Series
- The Wallet Library
- The Warwick Library
- The Warwick Shakespeare; succeeded by series: New Warwick Shakespeare
- The Wayfarer Books
- What Did They Teach Series
- Wonders of Life

== Annuals ==
- Blackie's Boys' Annual
- Blackie's Children's Annual
- Blackie's Girls' Annual

== Notable staff ==
- Marilyn Malin, later managing director of Methuen Children's Books, started her career as a secretary at Black and Son in the 1950s.

== See also ==
- John Dougall (mathematician)
- Walter Jerrold
- UK children's book publishers
