= William Rainey =

Artist and illustrator

- Born: 21 July 1852; Kennington, London, England
- Died: 24 January 1936 (aged 83); Eastbourne, Sussex, England
- Occupations: Artist and illustrator
- Years active: 1872–1936
- Known for: Illustrations for boys adventure books

William Rainey RI RBA ROI (21 July 1852 – 24 January 1936) was a British artist and illustrator. He was a prolific illustrator of both books and magazines and illustrated about 200 books during his career. He also kept painting and exhibited his work frequently. Rainey also wrote and illustrated six books himself, one was a colourful book for young children, the other five were juvenile fiction.

== Early life ==
Rainey was born in Kennington, London, on 21 July 1852. He was the third of eight children (Note: Rainey had five brothers and two sisters, all of whom died before him except for his brother Charles (1862–1941) and sister Frances Sarah.(1864–1938)) of the distinguished anatomist and teacher George Rainey (1801 – 16 November 1884) and Martha Dee, a farmer's daughter (c. 1827 – 27 May 1905). Rainey's parents were married at the parish church in Twyning, Gloucestershire, England on 31 December 1846. Rainey was originally intended for a career at sea, but his father, who had himself run away from an early apprenticeship, allowed him instead to study at the South Kensington School of Art. The 1871 census shows that, by the time Rainey was 18, he was a student at the Royal Academy.

== Marriage and family ==
Rainey married Harriet Matilda Bennett, (12 February 1860 – c. March 1919), the daughter of Thomas Bennett, a civil engineer, at the Parish Church of St George the Martyr, Holborn, (Note: There are two Parishes of St George the Martyr in London, but the other St George the Martyr, Southwark is south of the River Thames and therefore not the church in question as the marriage was in Middlesex.) London on 11 June 1877. The couple had four children:

- Florence Harriet Bennett (1878–1959), who was his executor at his death in 1936
- Edith Elsie Rainey(1882–1896), who died as a teenager
- George William Bennett Rainey (Q2 1886 – 1956), Shown as assisting his father in the 1911 census.
- Victor Thomas James Rainey (Q3 1889 – 30 September 1917), a Second Lieutenant in the Devonshire Regiment, killed at Ypres in the First World War.

== Later life ==
Rainey's wife died in Eastbourne in the second quarter of 1919. The local newspaper recalled that Rainey had moved to Eastbourne about this time, and it was the Eastbourne address that the War Office used in the correspondence about the Medals awarded to his son Victor.

Raines was walking on Grand Parade on the sea-front promenade at Eastborne on 24 January 1935 when he collapsed and died before a doctor could be called. He was only a short distance from his home at Avonmore, 24 Granville Road. (Note: Avonmore is now a small block of flats.) His daughter Florence Harriet was the executor of his will. His estate was valued at just under £400.

== Works ==
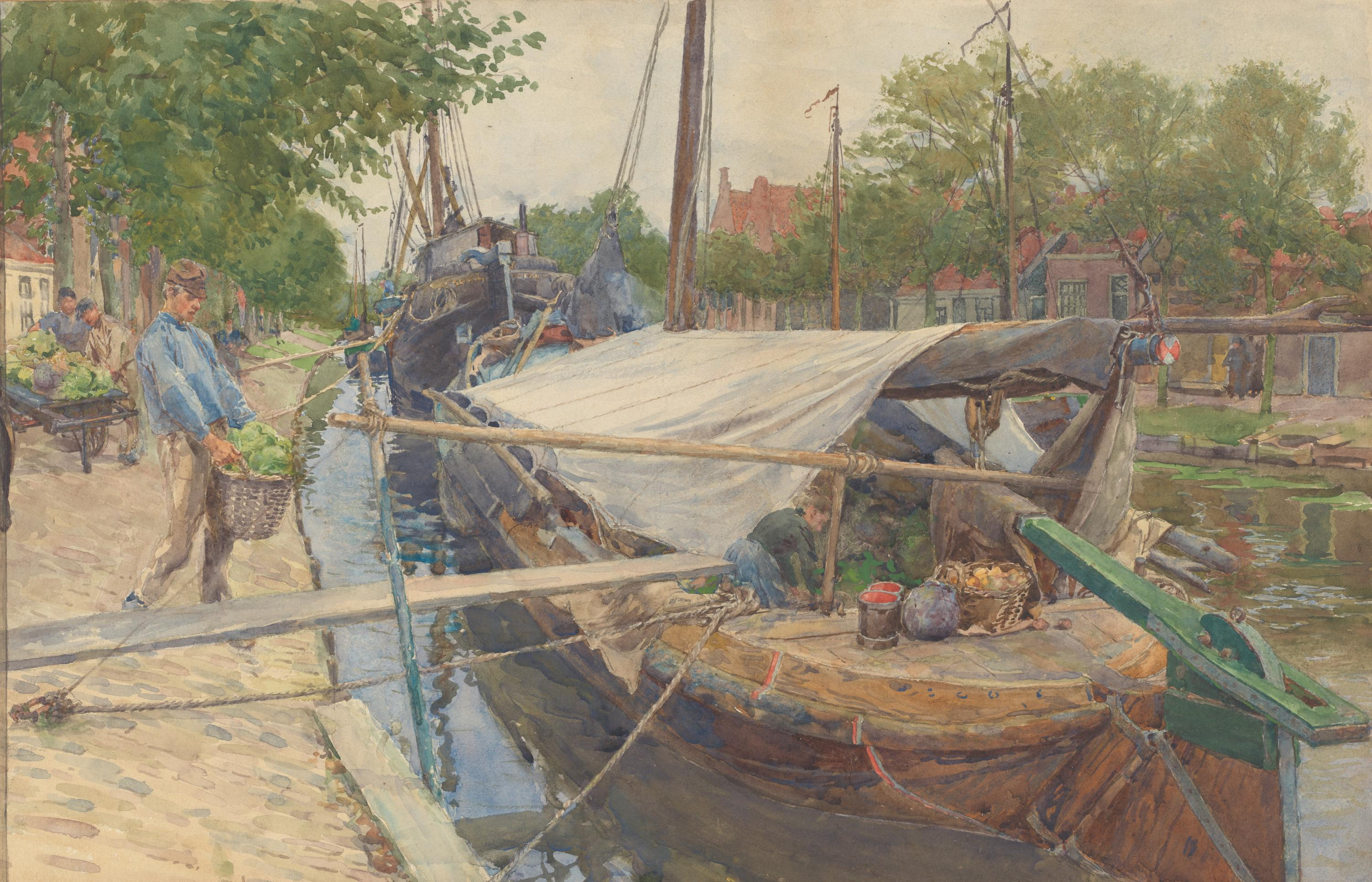
The Market Boat (1901). Watercolour, by William Rainey (Note: It is not clear is this was one of the works that was purchased during Gill's trip to Britain to purchase art for Australian Museums. The Catalogue for the National Gallery of Victoria records this painting as having been selected by the Royal Academy. Bénézit records a piece by Rainey with the same title at the Mulhouse Museum of Fine Arts.)

Rainey exhibited paintings throughout his life, it was a form of marketing which earned him commissions. Rainey was a regular exhibitor at the Royal Academy, starting in 1878 with Lyme Regis. Between 1878 and 1904 he exhibited 17 times (showing two works in both 1884 and 1901) at the Royal Academy, and continued to exhibit thereafter, including two works at the Franco-British exhibition in 1908. Rainey exhibited at The Royal Academy, Royal Institute of Oil Painters, the Royal Institute of Painters in Water Colours and the RBA. In all, Rainey exhibited over 200 works in the UK. (Note: Rainey exhibited as follows: two works at the Glasgow Institute of the Fine Arts, 16 works at the Walker Art Gallery, Liverpool, five works at the Manchester City Art Gallery, 23 works at the Royal Academy, four works at the Royal Society of British Artists, 150 works at the Royal Institute of Painters in Water Colours, and six works at the Royal Institute of Oil Painters.)

Rainey was elected a member of the Royal Institute of Painters in Water Colours on 6 April 1891, and a member of the Royal Institute of Oil Painters on 25 November 1981. Rainey won medals for watercolours both the 1893 World's Columbian Exposition in Chicago and the 1900 Paris Exhibition. Rainey was still exhibiting in the 1930s, even though by now he has moved on to the retired list of the Royal Institute of Painters in Water Colours, being an honorary member from 1930.

=== Magazine illustration ===
Rainey did more illustration for magazines than for books. Among the magazines he illustrated for were:

- Atalanta
- Black and White
- The Boy's Own Paper
- Cassell's Family Magazine
- Chums
- The Girl's Own Paper
- Good Words
- The Graphic
- The Harmsworth Magazine
- The Illustrated London News
- Little Folks
- The Ludgate Monthly
- The Penny Magazine
- Punch
- The Quiver
- The Sphere
- Springtime
- The Strand Magazine
- Sunday at Home
- The Temperance Monthly
- Young England
- The Windsor Magazine

==== Examples of magazine illustration ====
Rainey illustrated many stories for magazines. The first example was story that was translated into French for Hetzel's Magasin d’Éducation et de Récréation. (Note: This was a magazine aimed at juveniles that had first carried many of Jules Verne, novels as serials) The story was Jock et ses amis (Jock and his Friends) write by A. Decker from an original by E. Hohler. (Note: This is apparently unrelated to Jock and his friend (1889), Blackie and Son, London by Cora Langton)

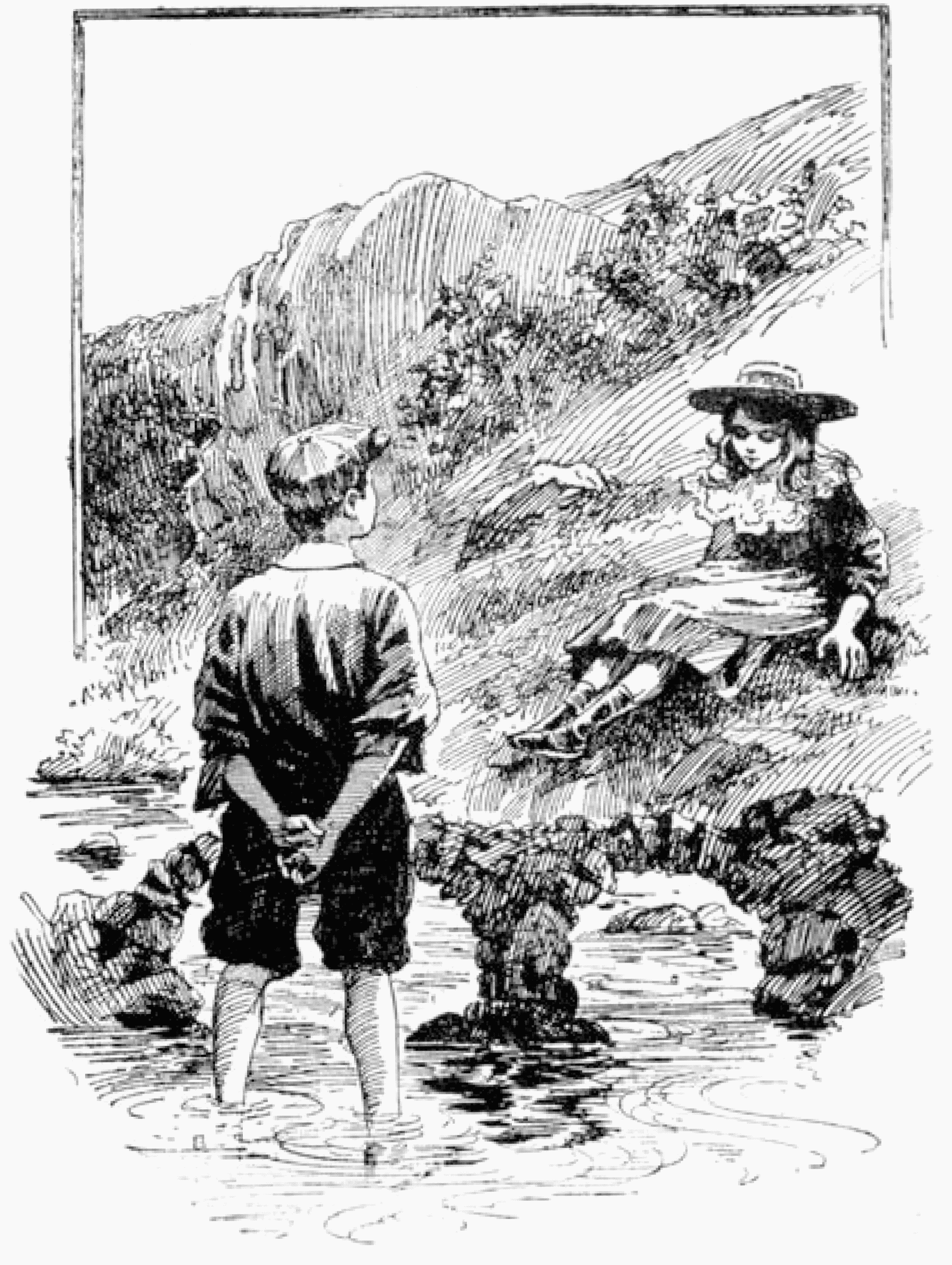
What do you think of that?

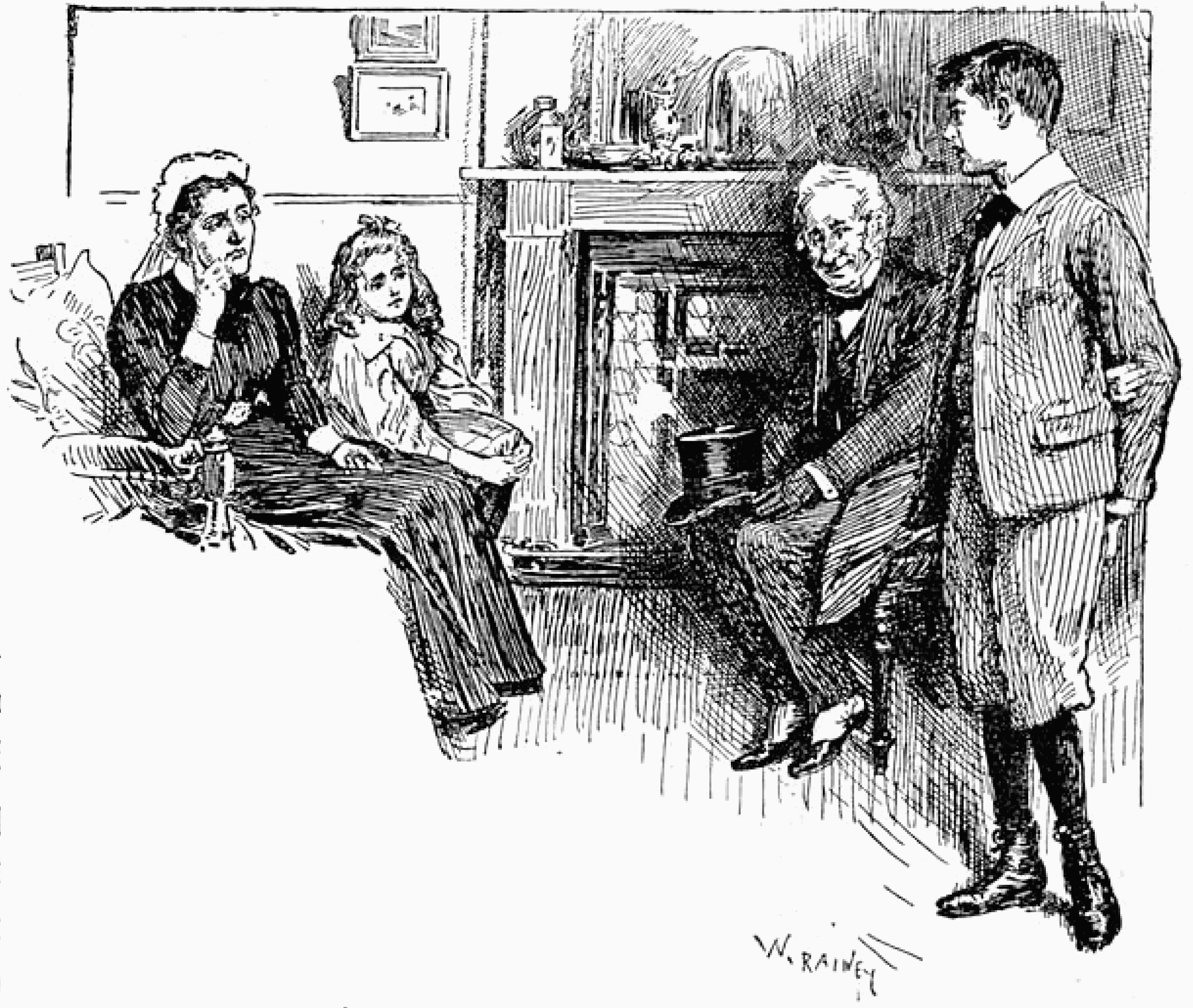
I don't want to go

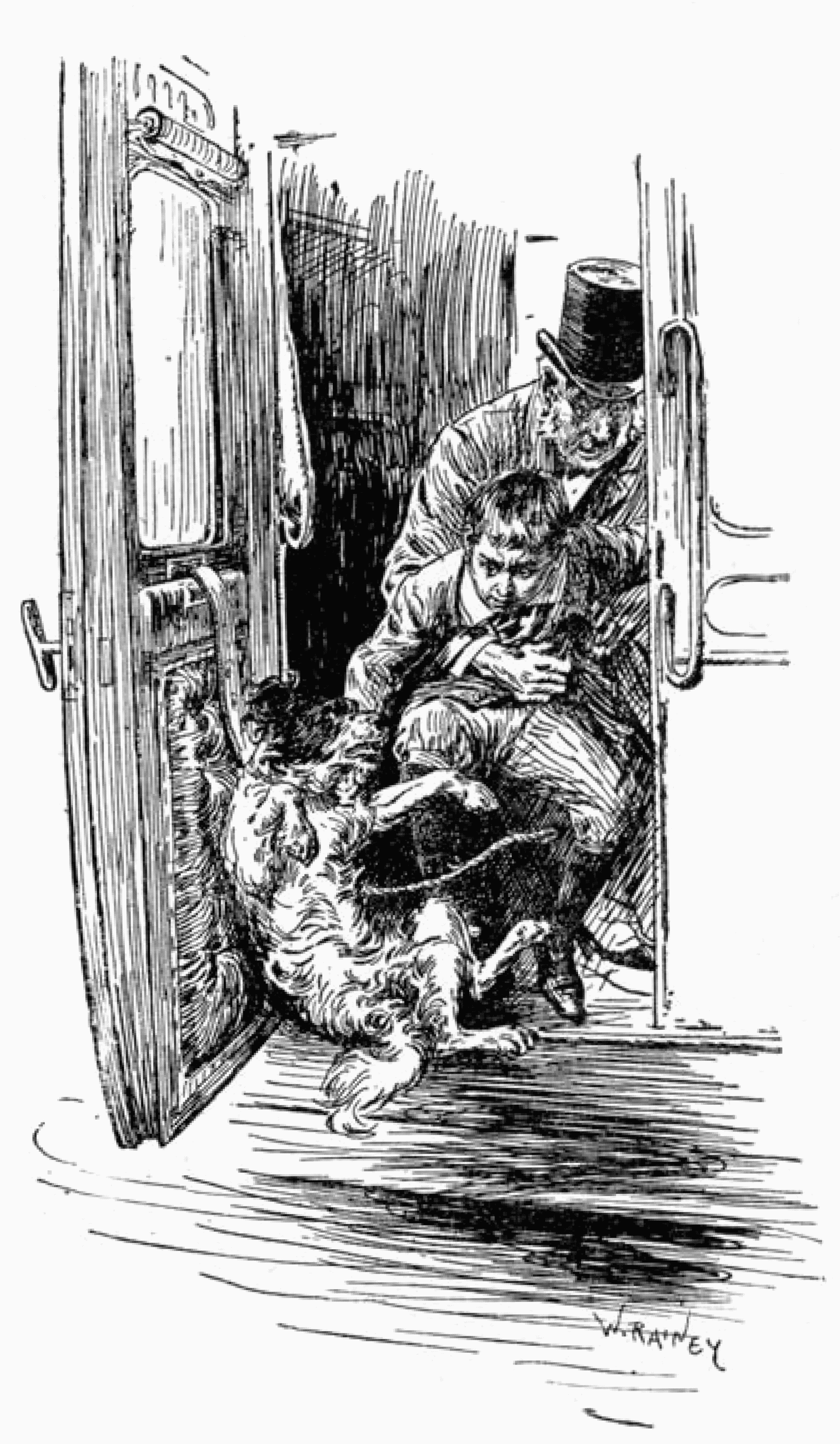
Jock managed to grab the leaping dog

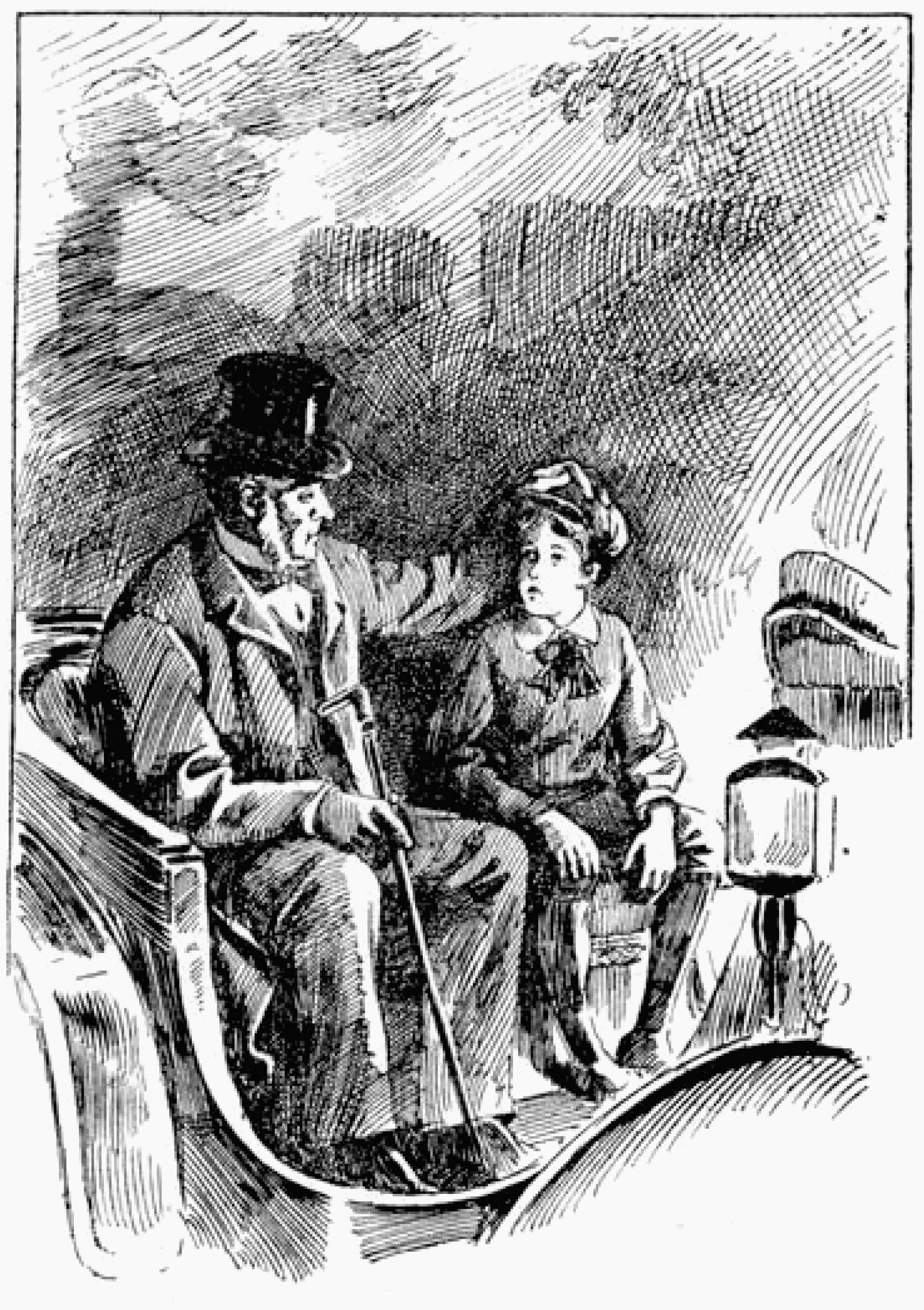
Mr. Grimshaw should have left you with me

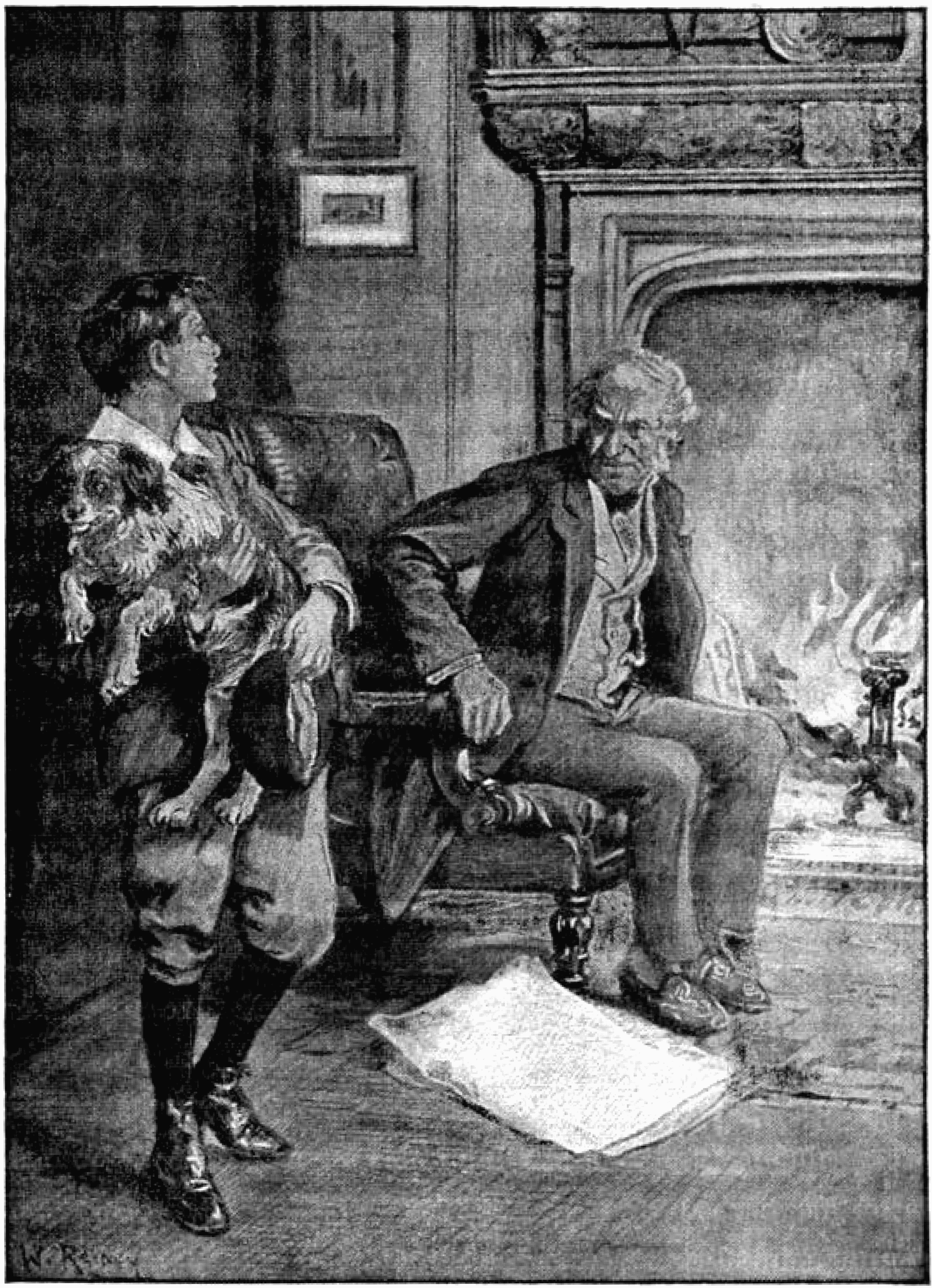
So you are Dick Pole's son?

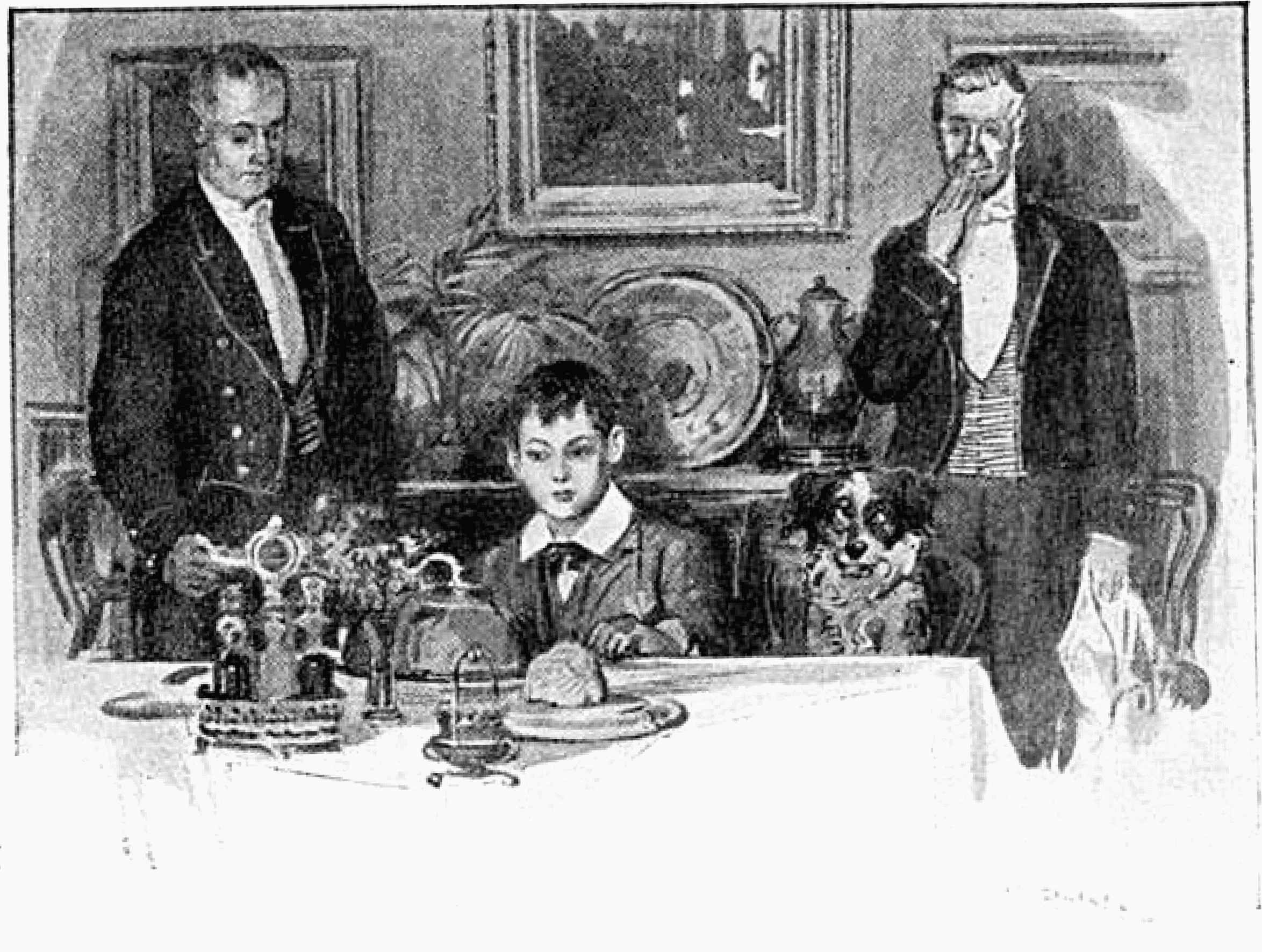
He had lunch while Tramp stood quietly in a chair

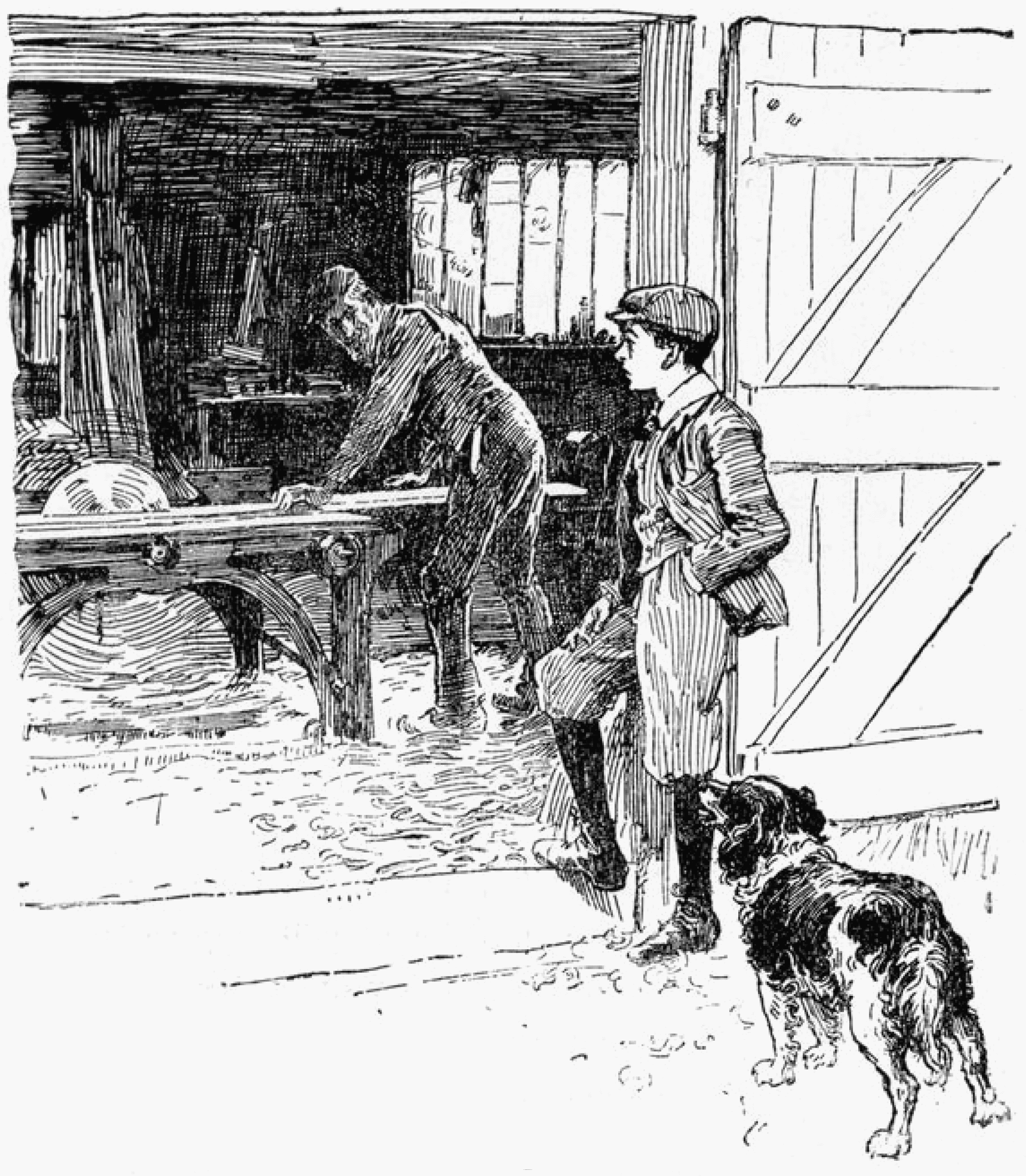
The two men turn around at his sudden appearance.

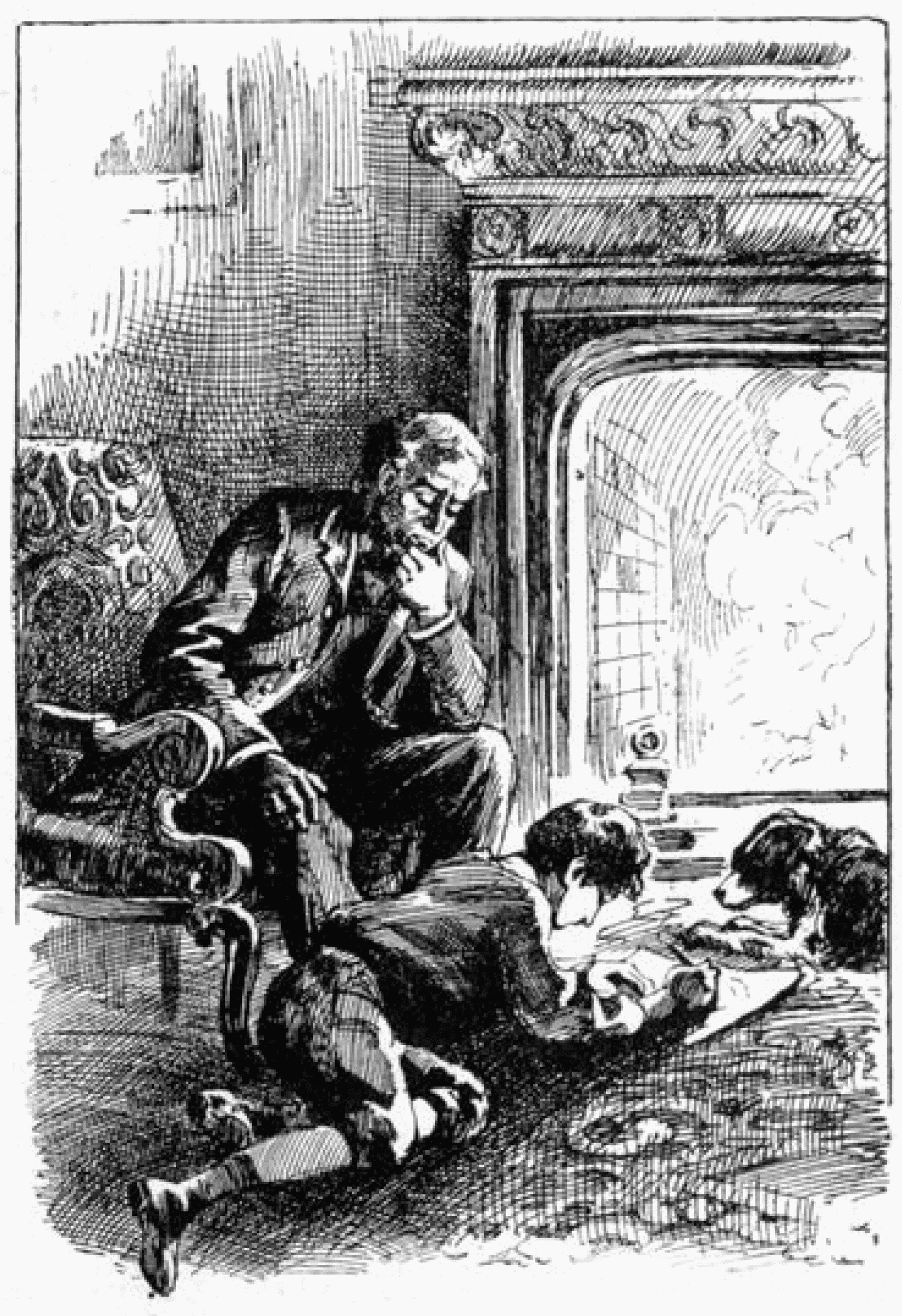
Then the child became silent, absorbed in his work

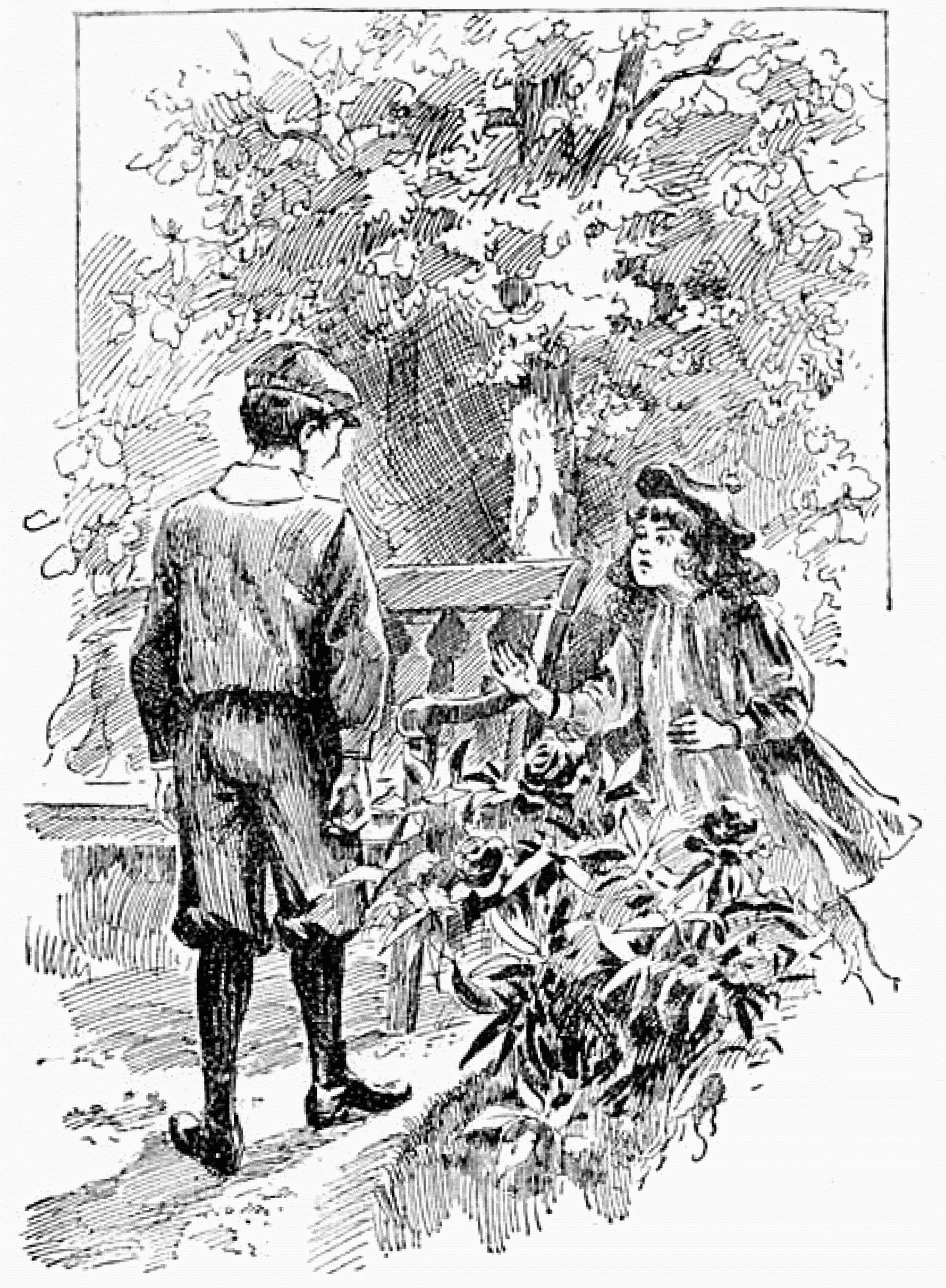
My name is Mollv.

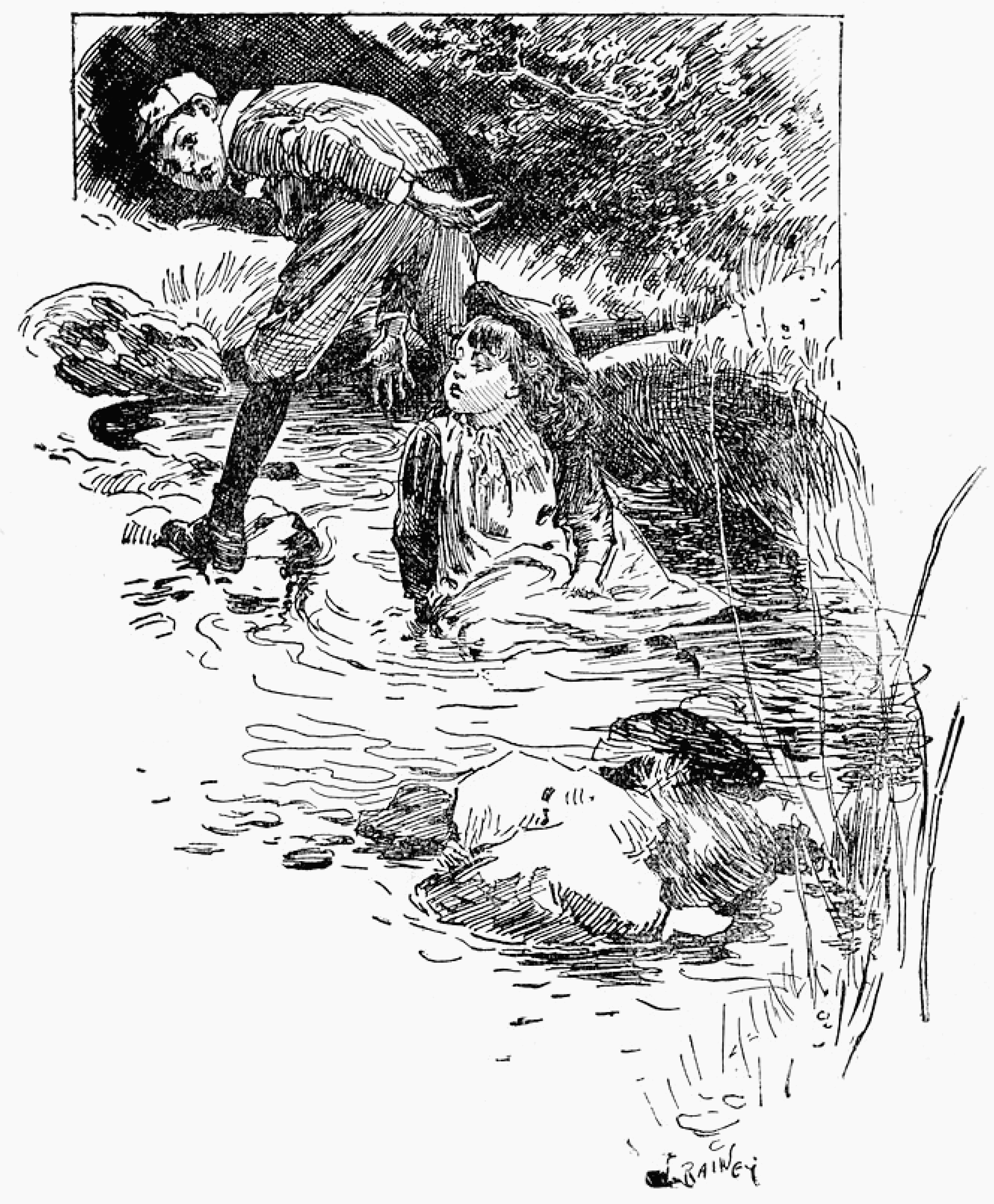
I just sat in the stream

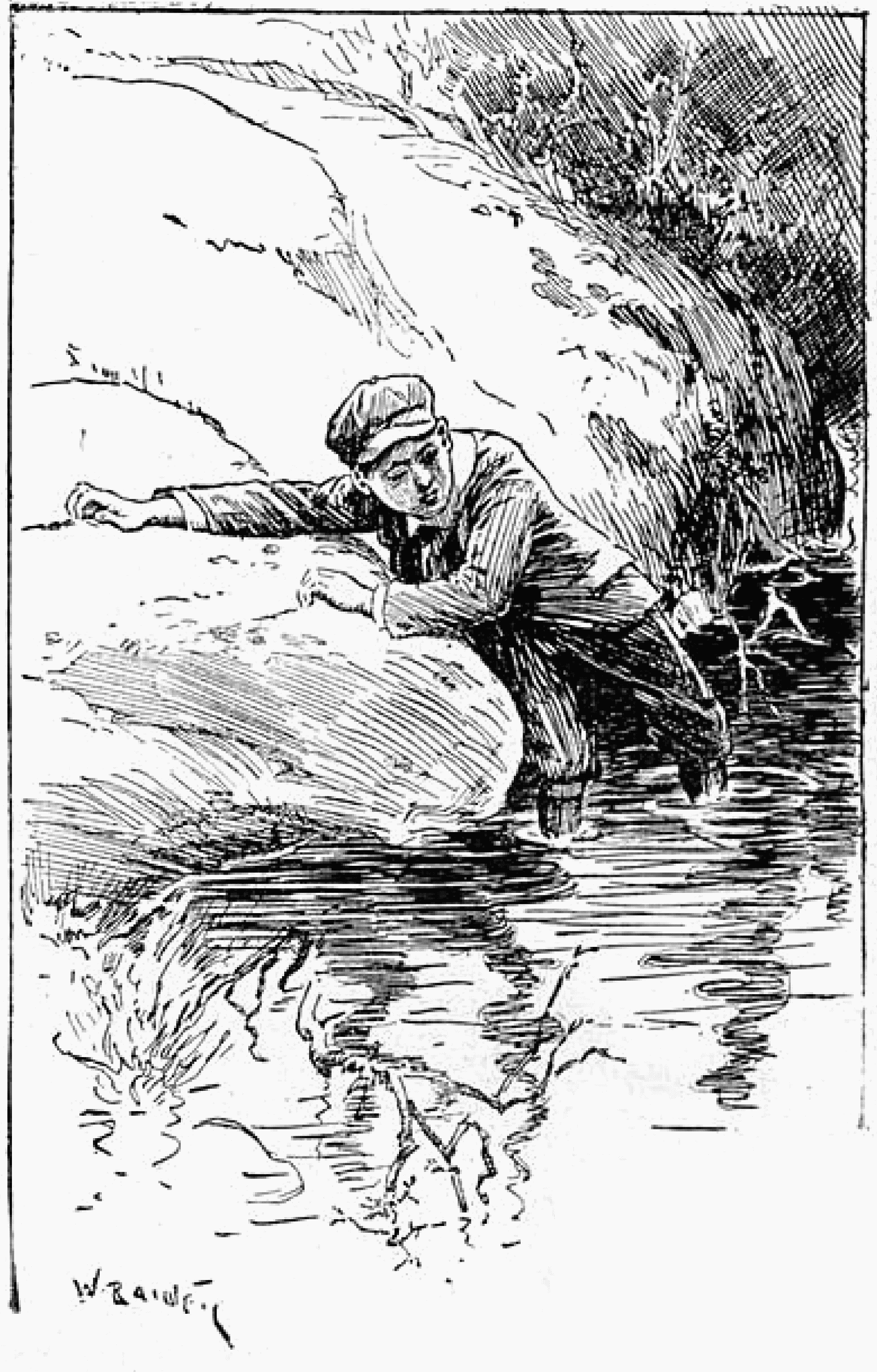
He managed to tear himself away from this swamp

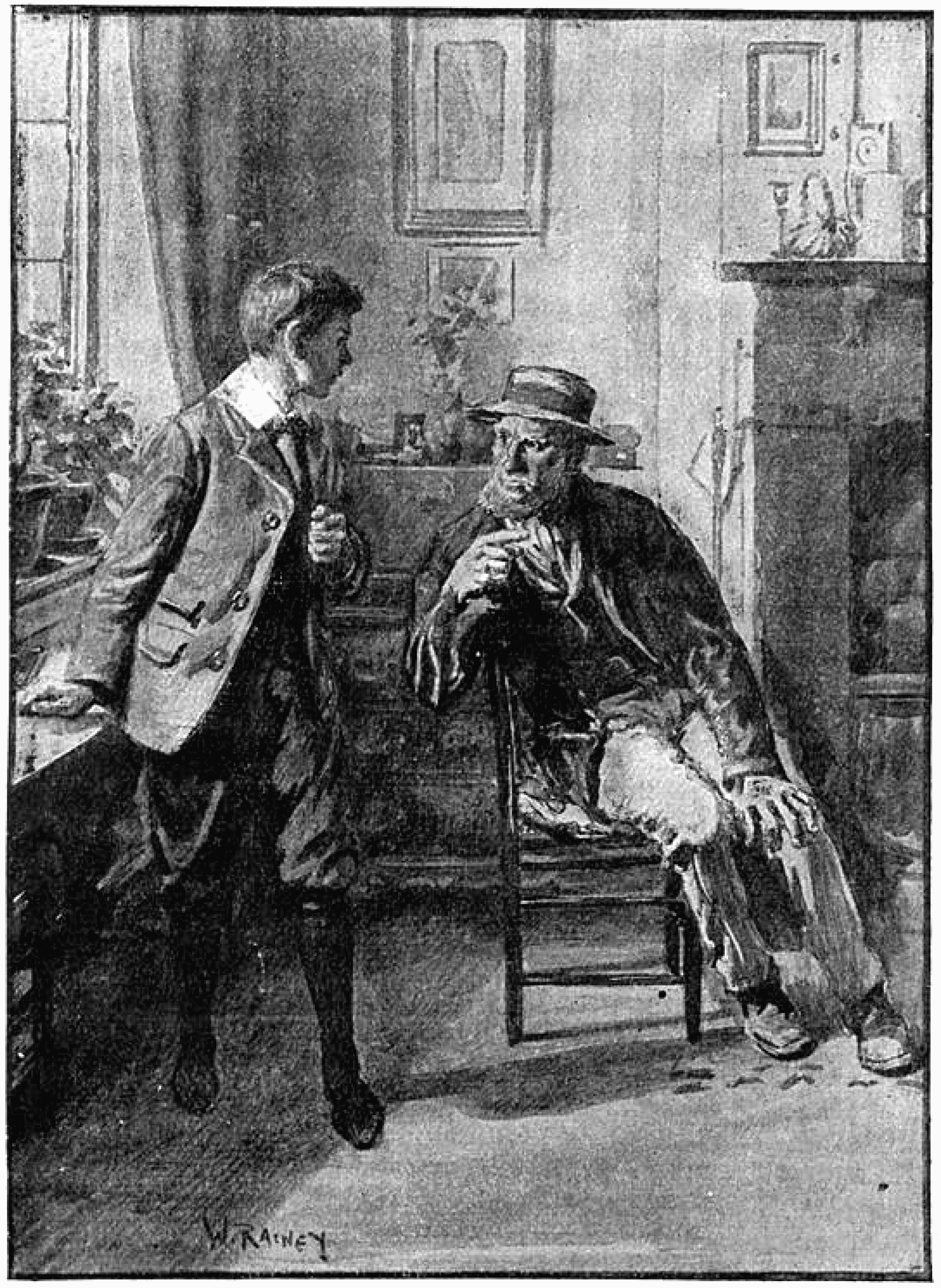
I will tell your master that you are an old rascal

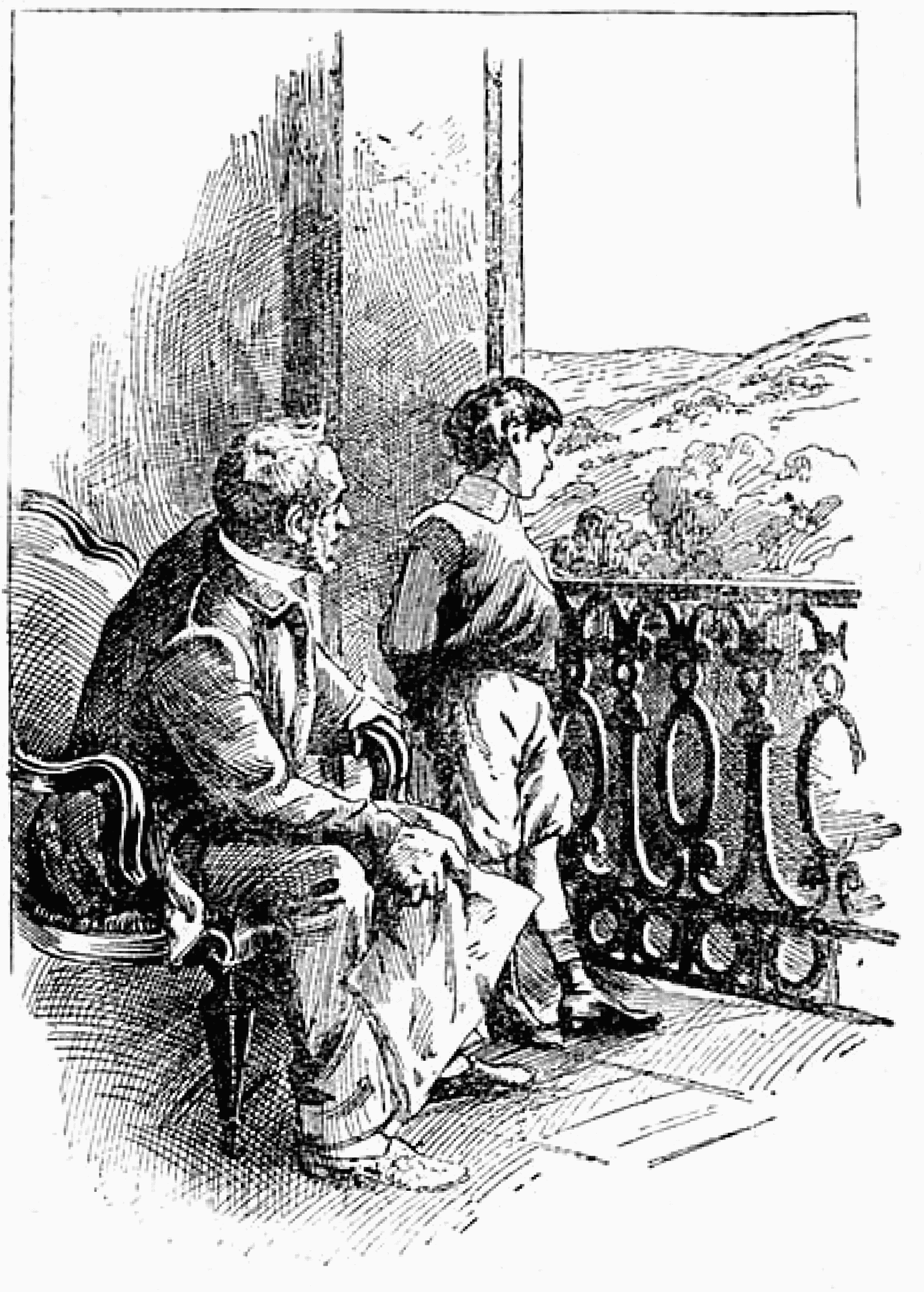
I wanted to keep you always close to me.

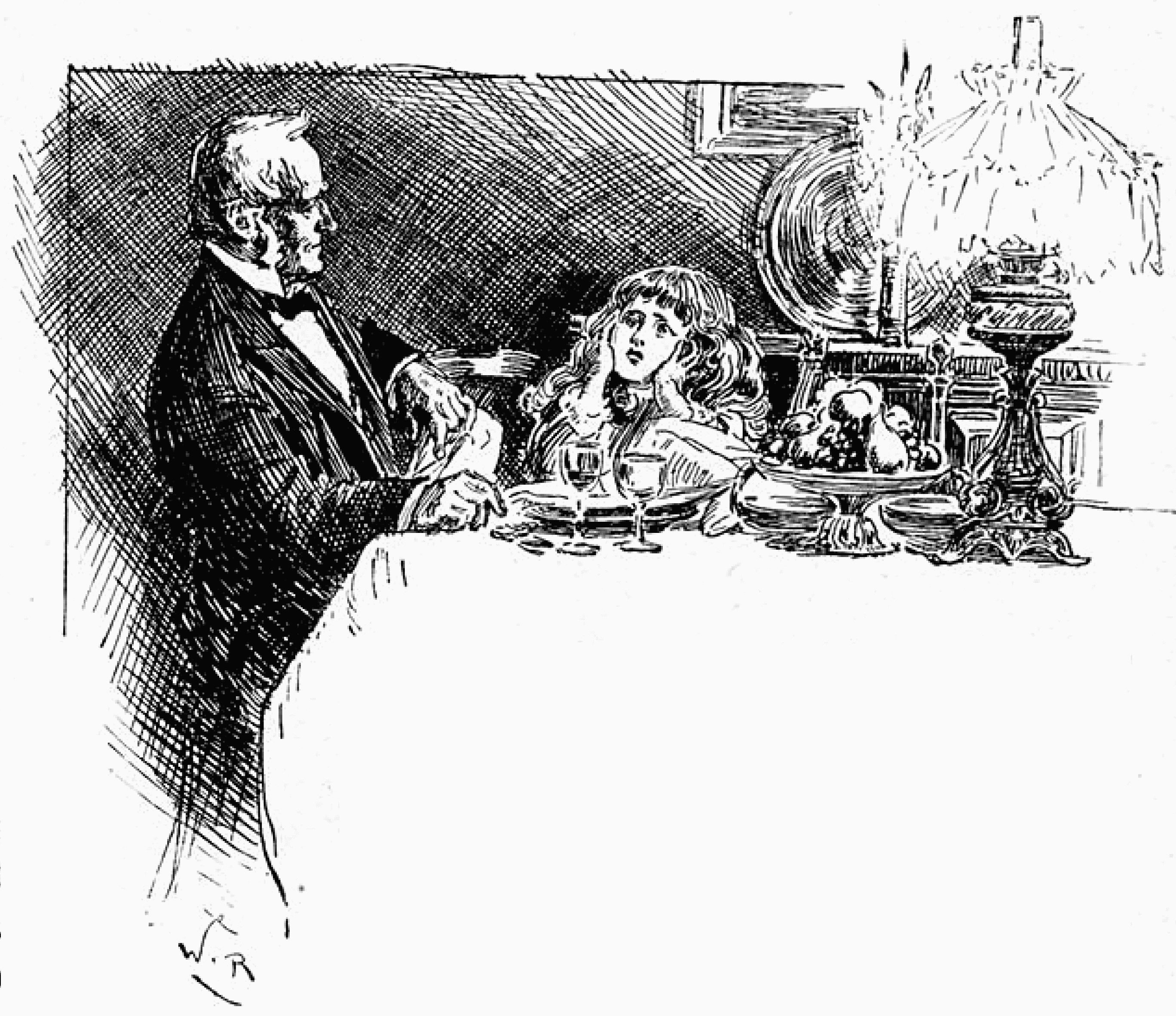
She looked at him with a pleading look

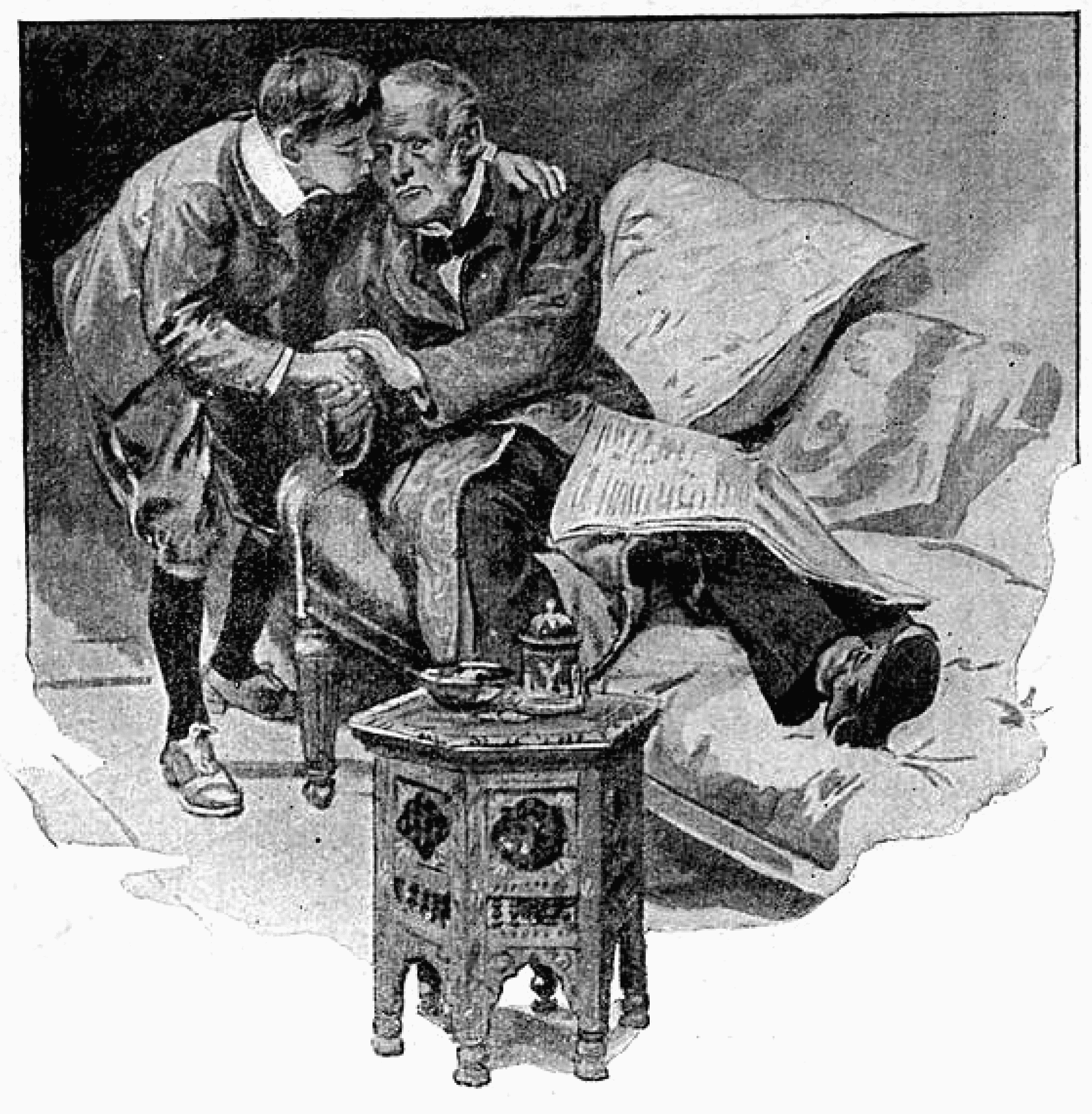
I am happy with this last farewell

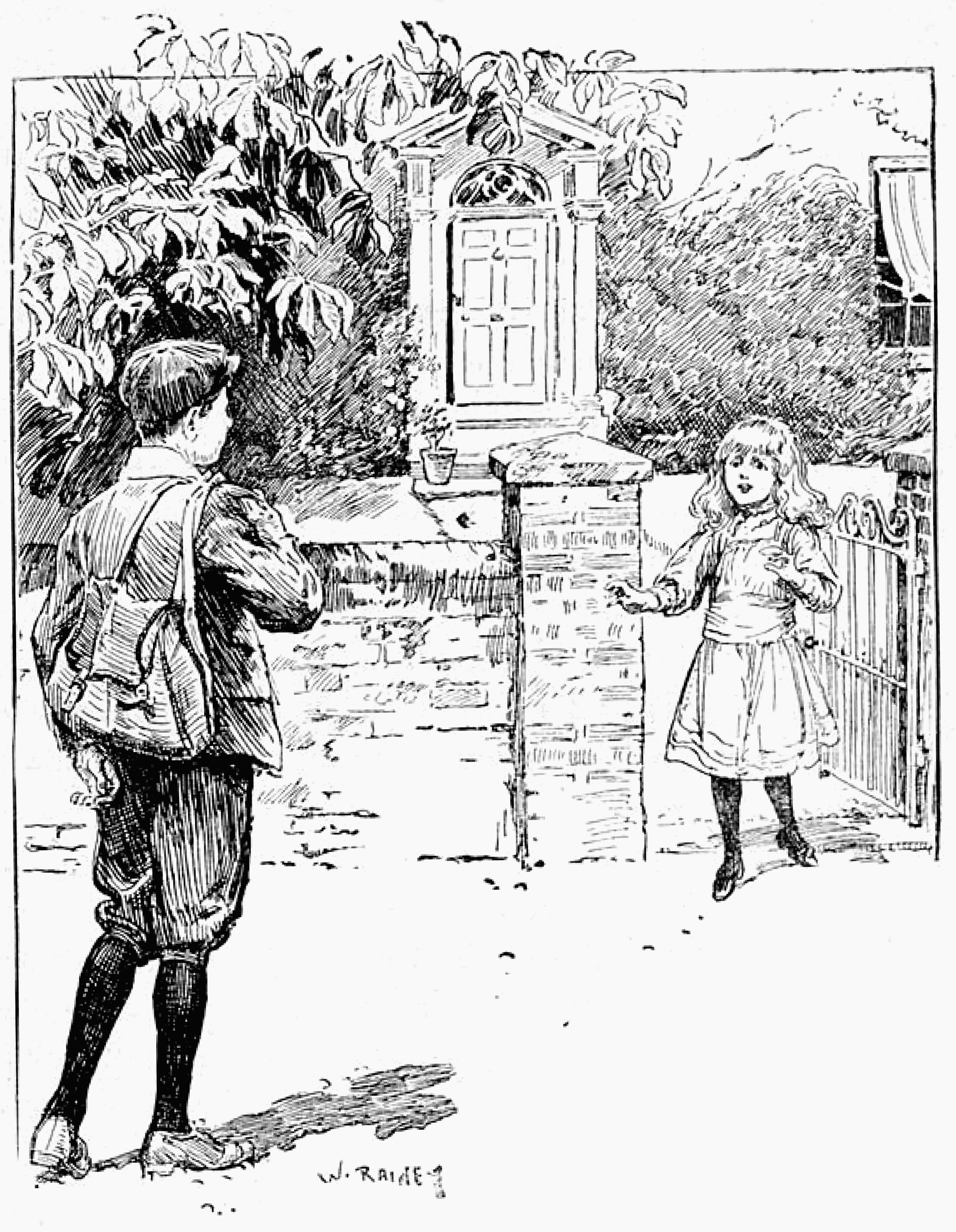
Jock felt the warmest welcome at the farm

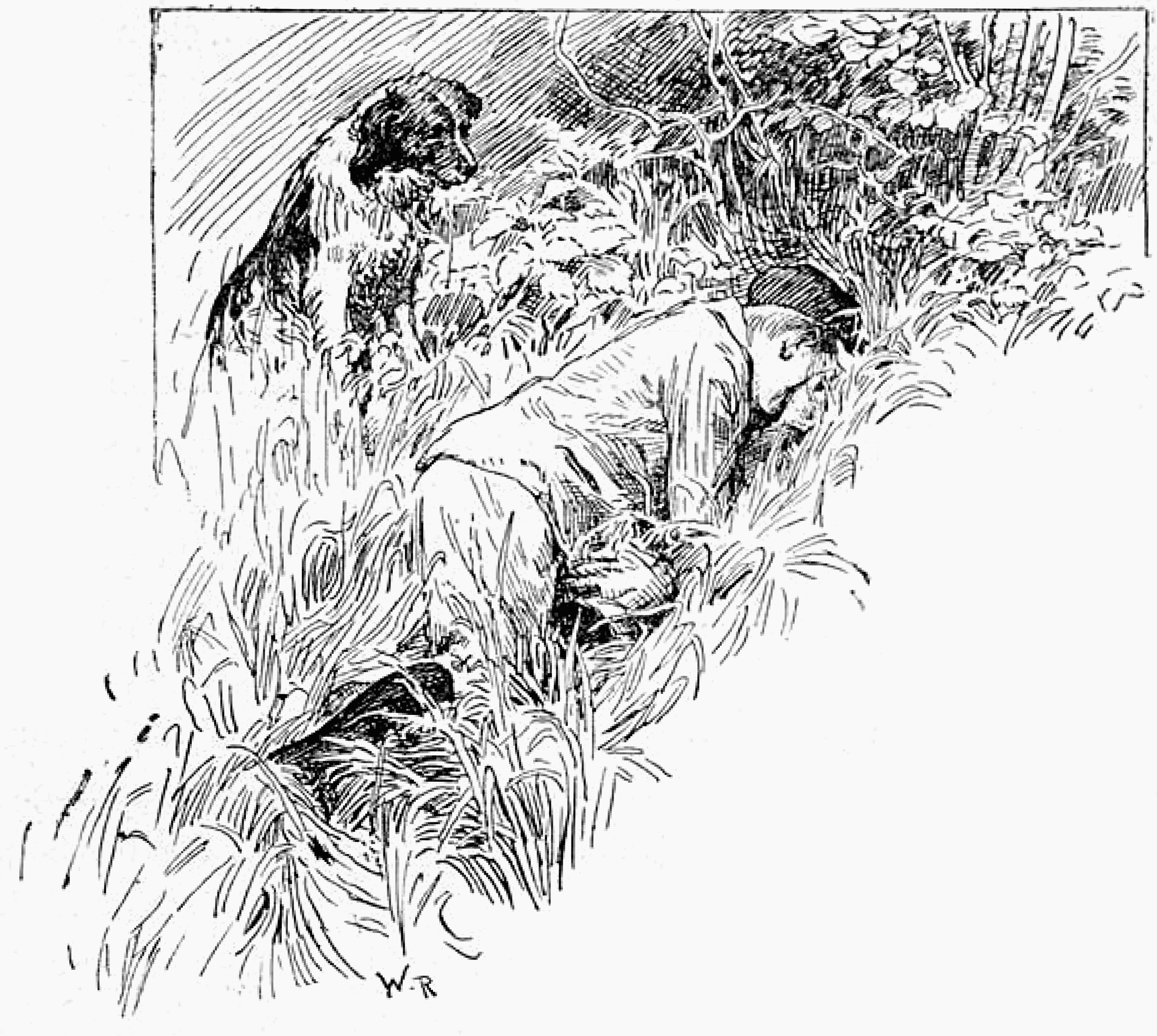
He fled across the fields and hid

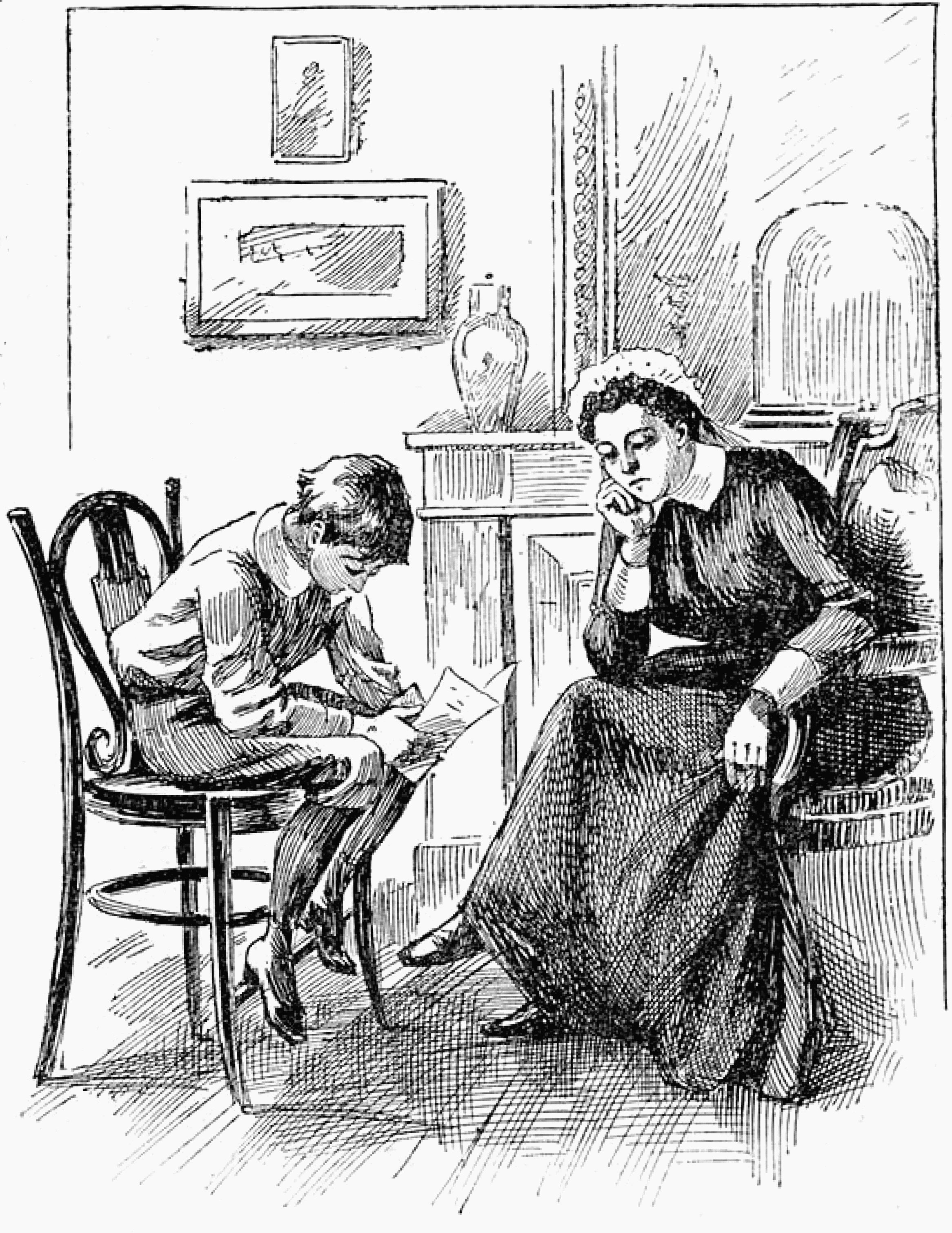
You are too young, too unreasonable to decide such a case

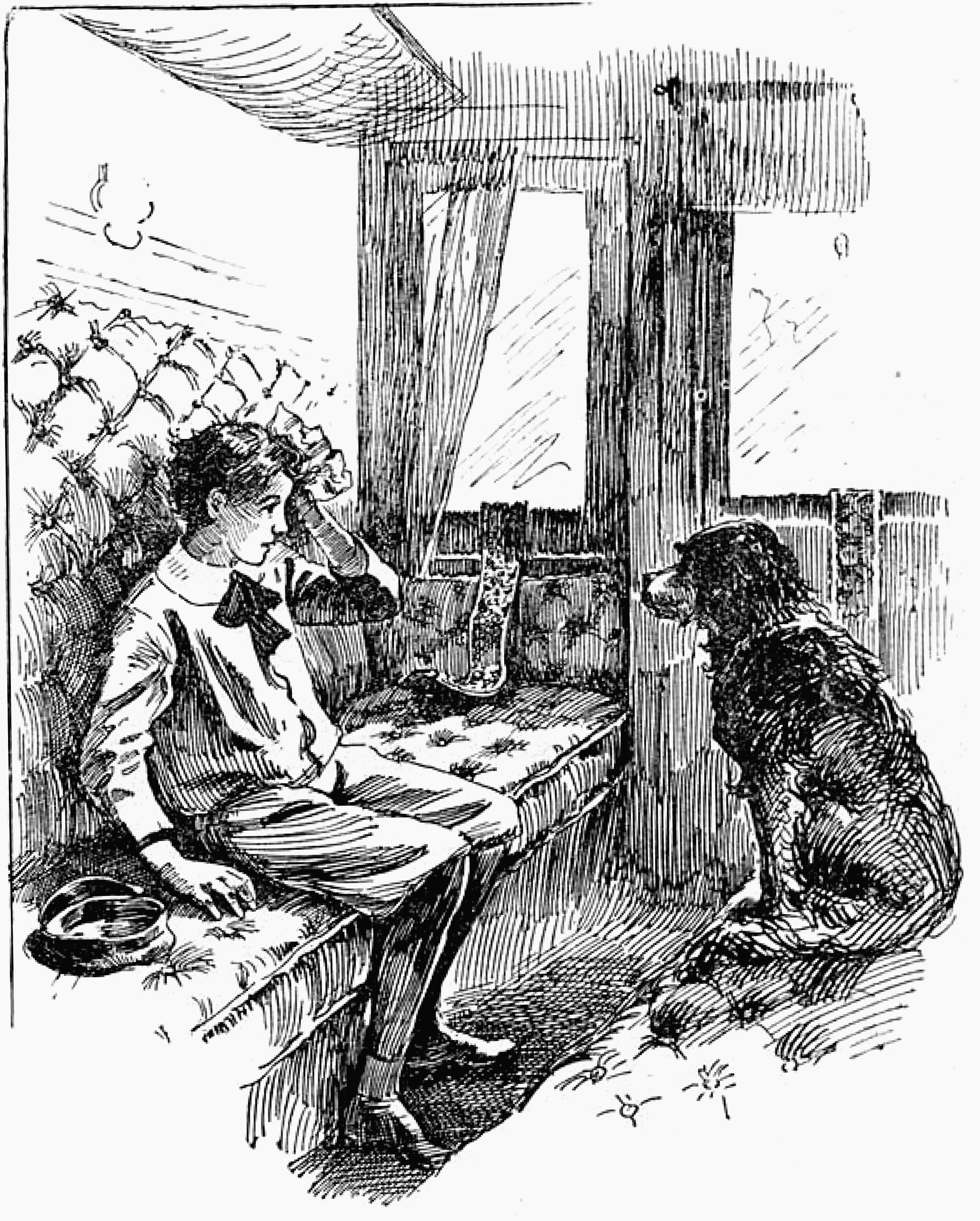
I didn't imagine it was so expensive

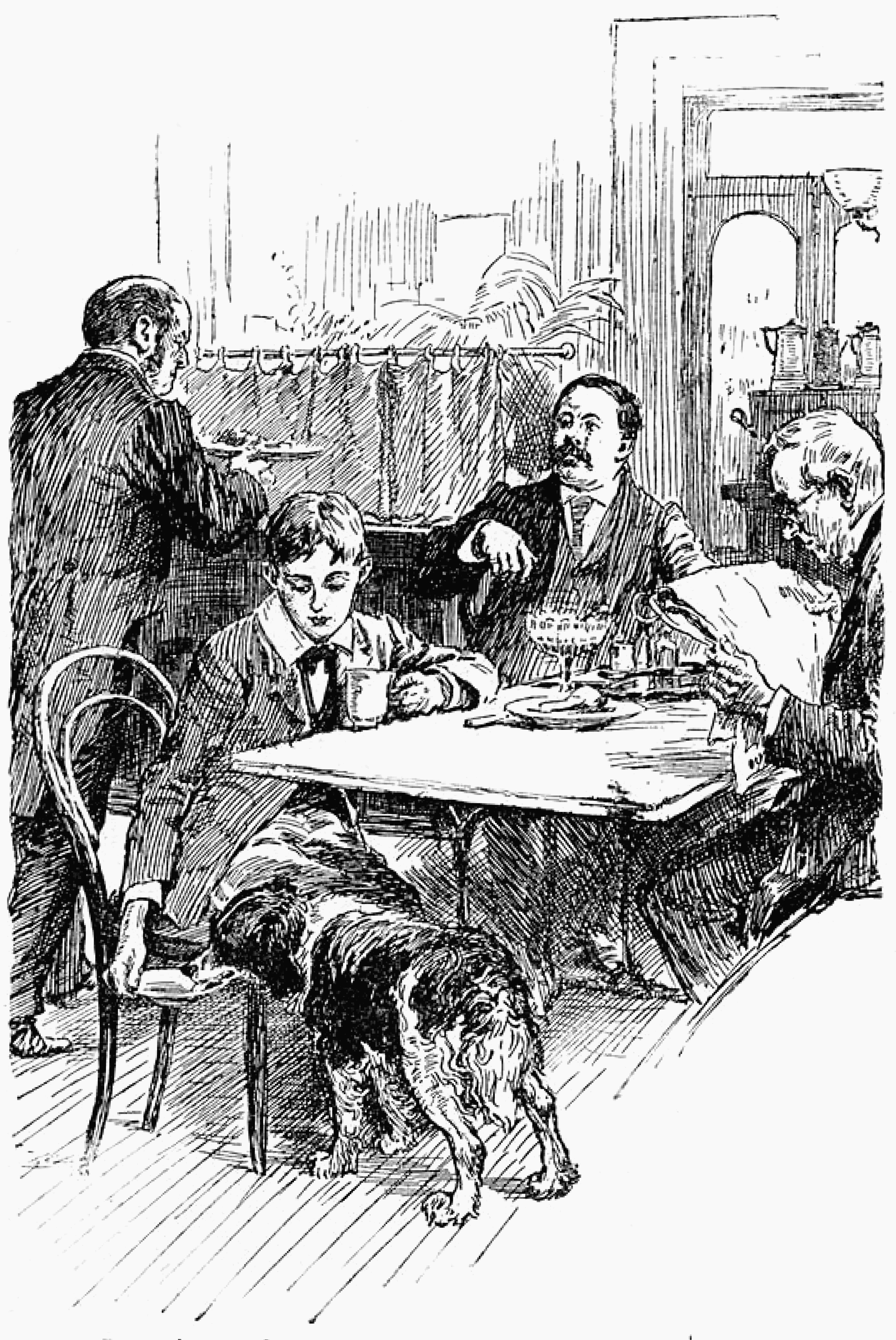
Tramp and Jock shared equally.

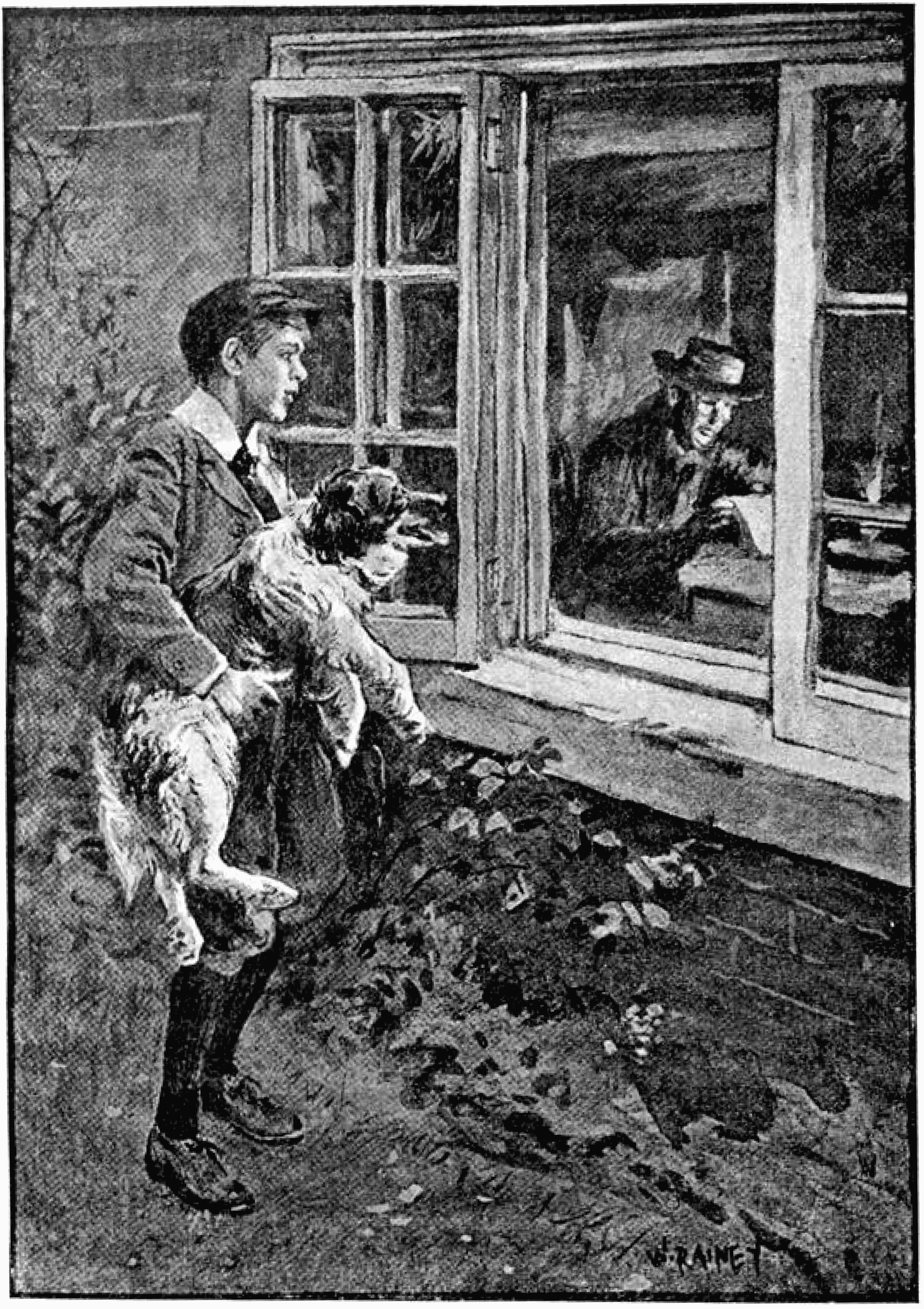
Then he slid to the window, and looked into the interior

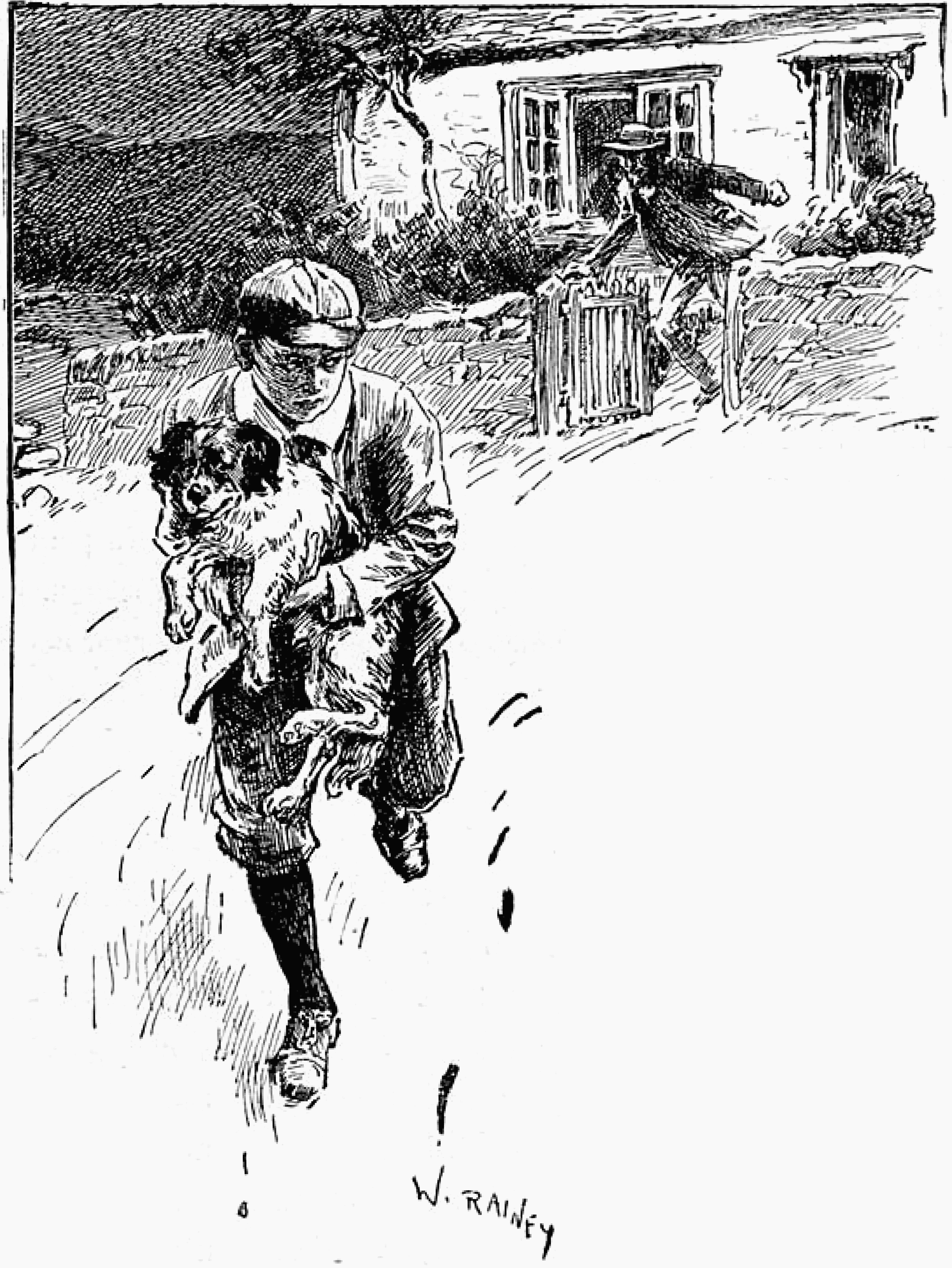
He resumed his run when the farmer reached the garden gate.

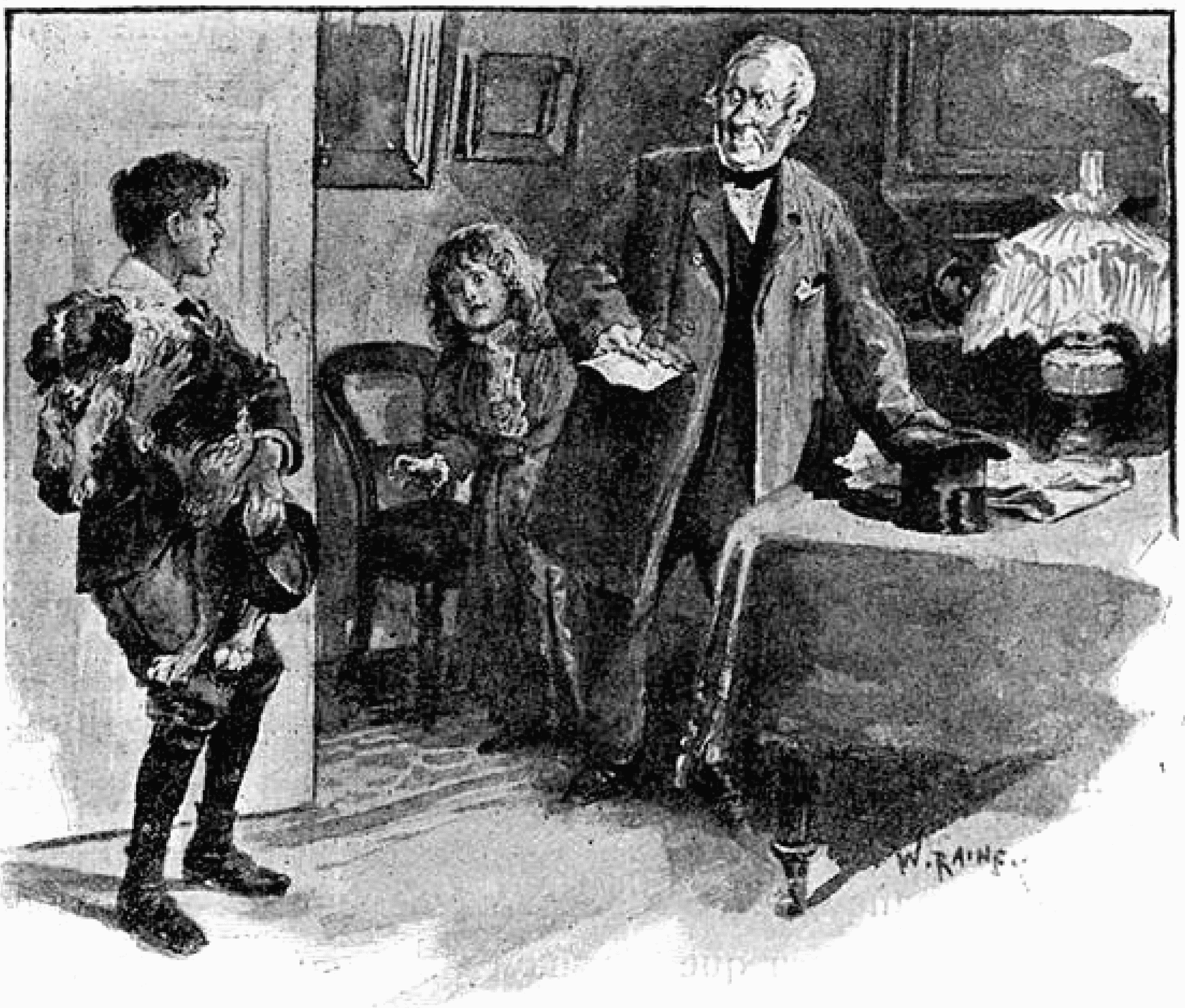
The boy's clothes were covered in mud

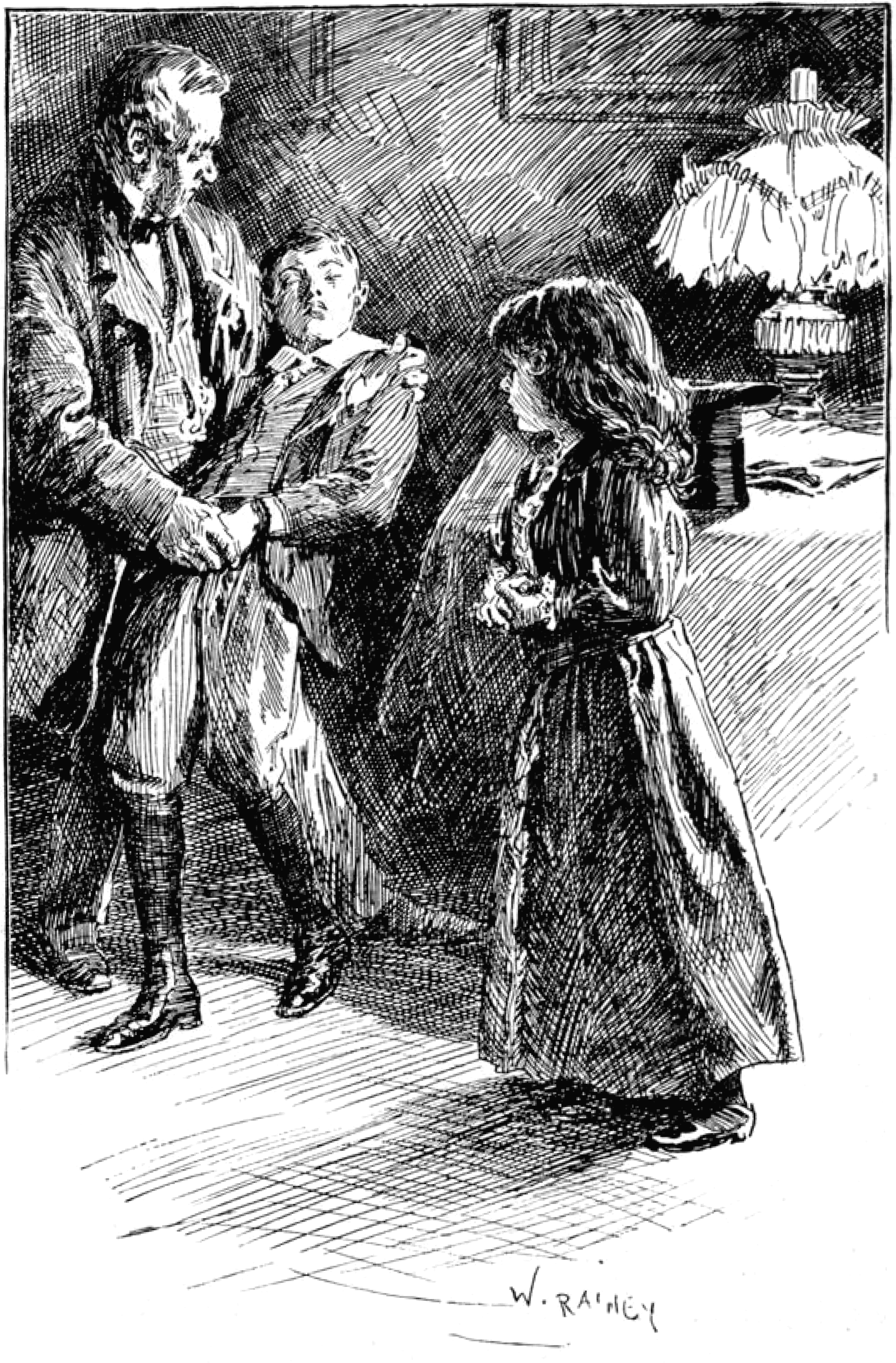
He stumbled a few steps and almost fell

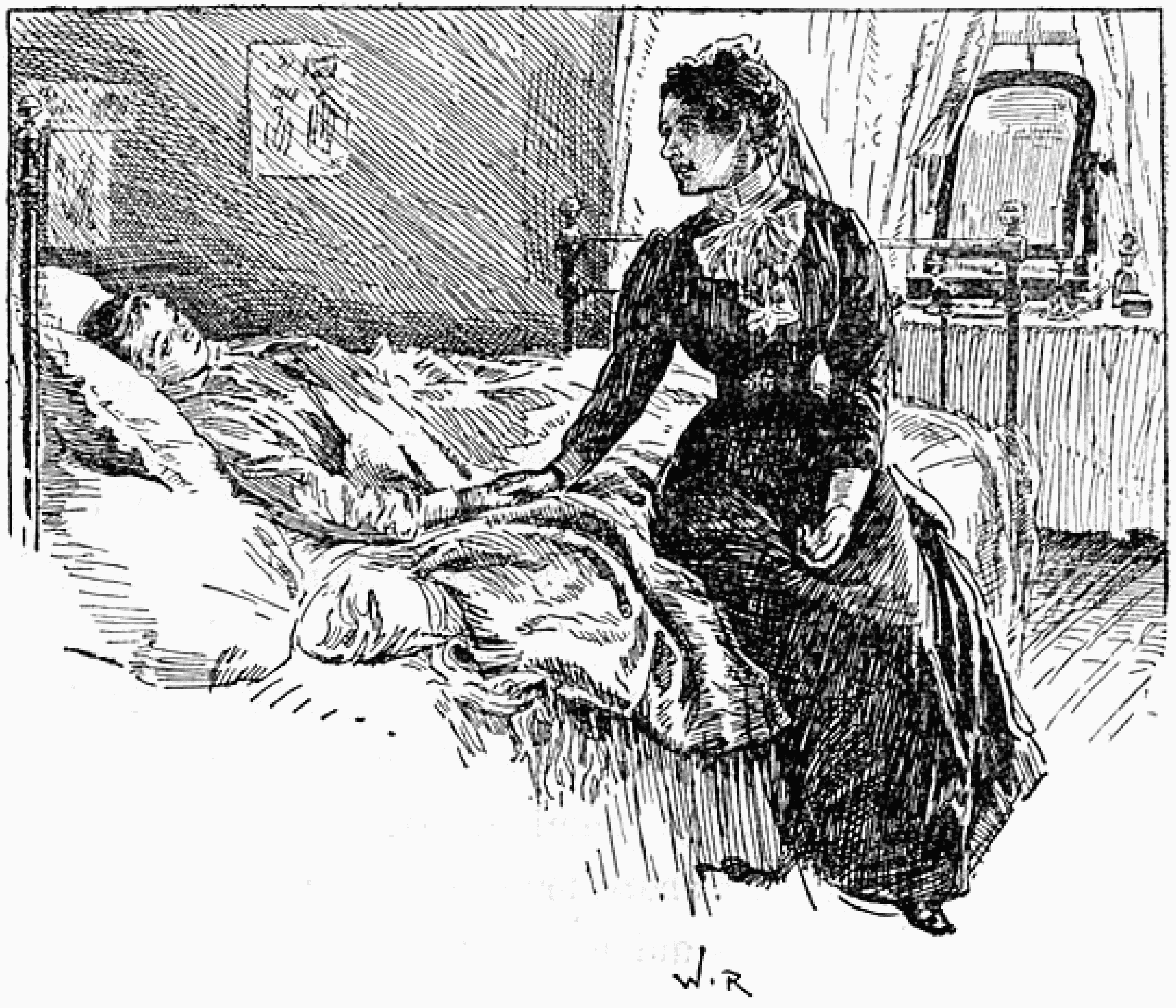
Mum, is it you?

Rainey also illustrated stories for adults. He was asked to illustrate the first story published in the new Strand Magazine. This was a short story, A Deadly Dilemma, about the dilemma a young man faces between derailing a train or leaving his sweetheart to be run-over, by Grant Allen.

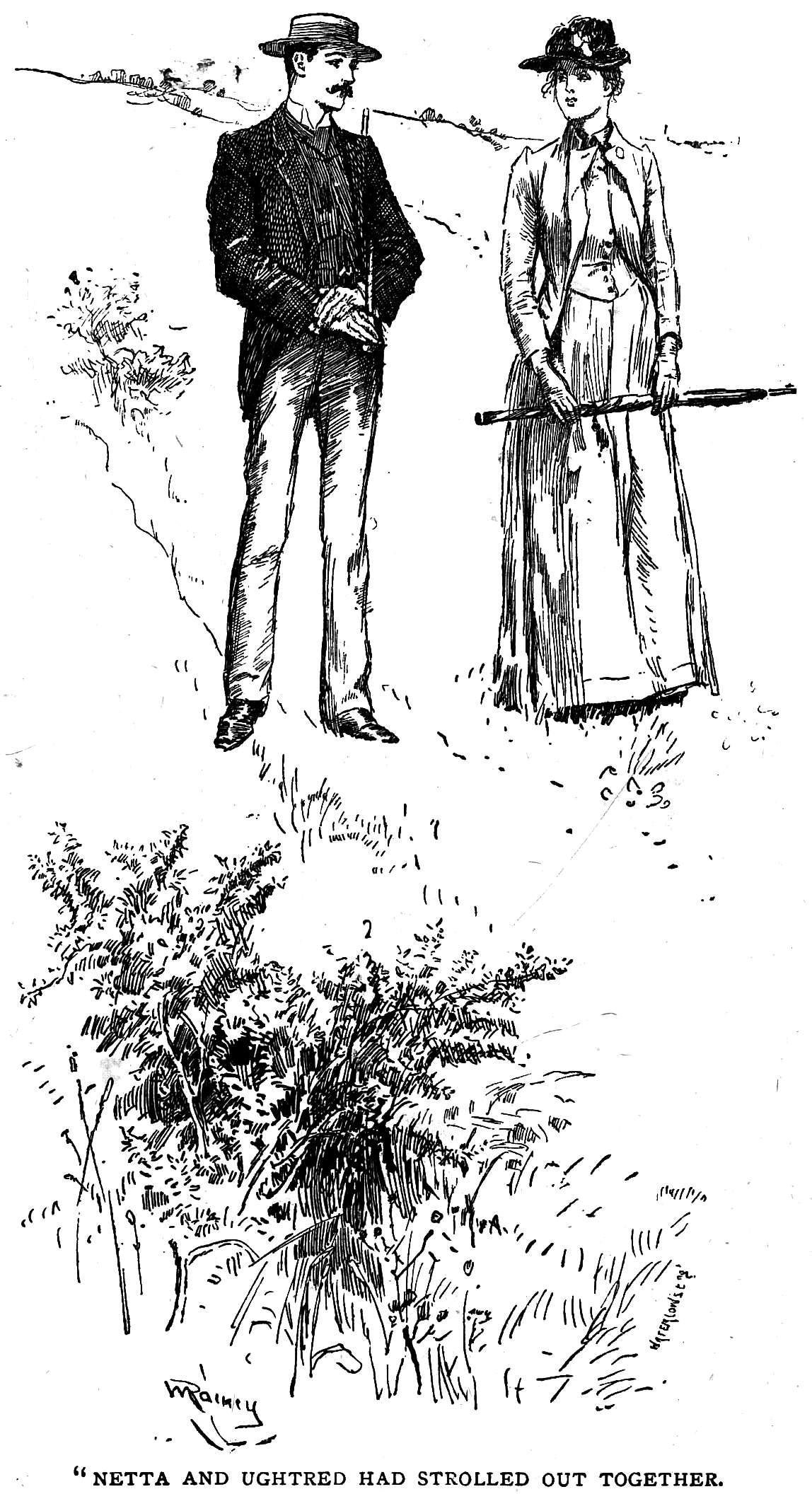
The two lovers walk out

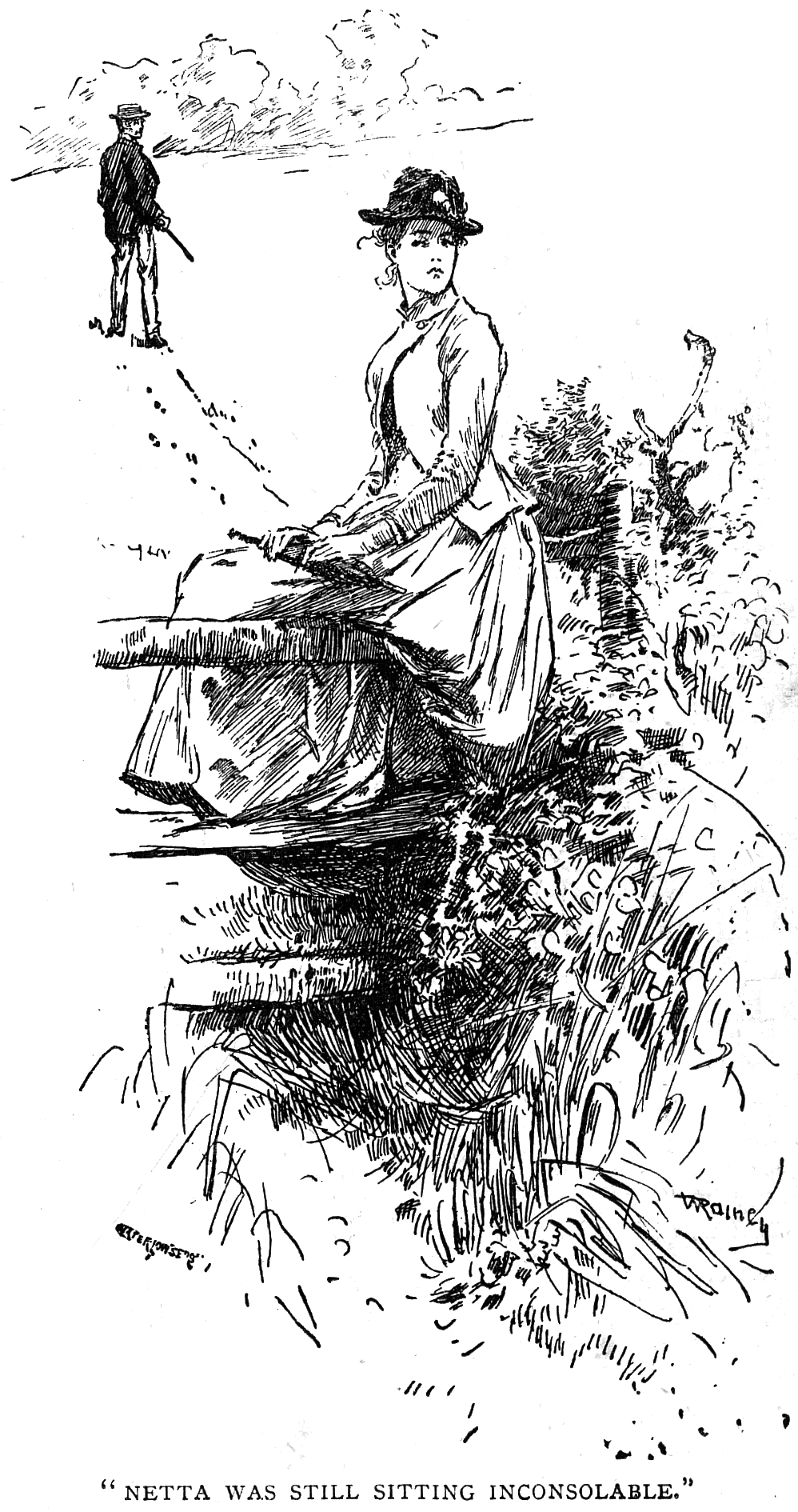
The lovers quarrel and part

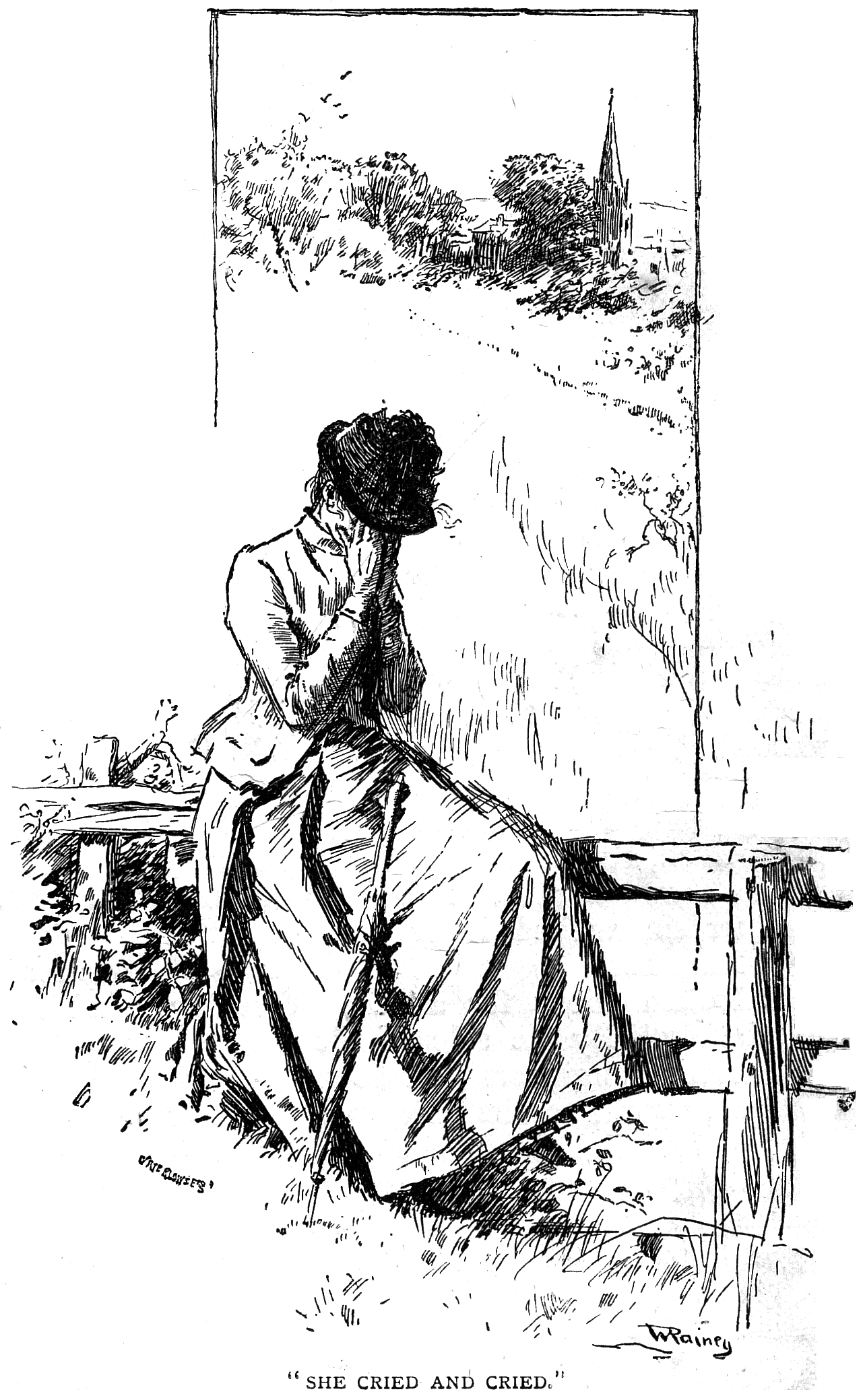
She bursts into tears

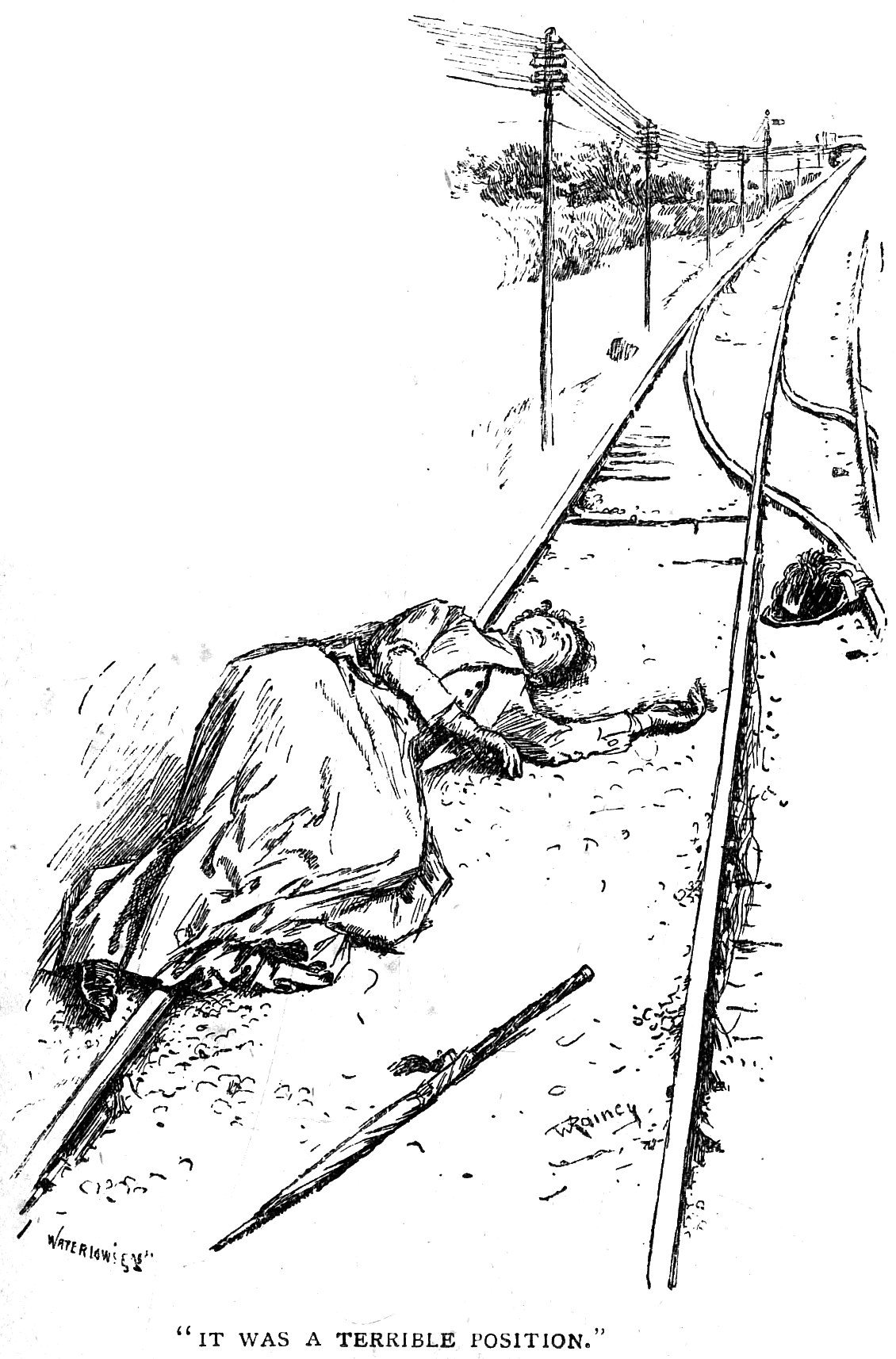
Frightened by a young colt, she runs and falls on the railway line

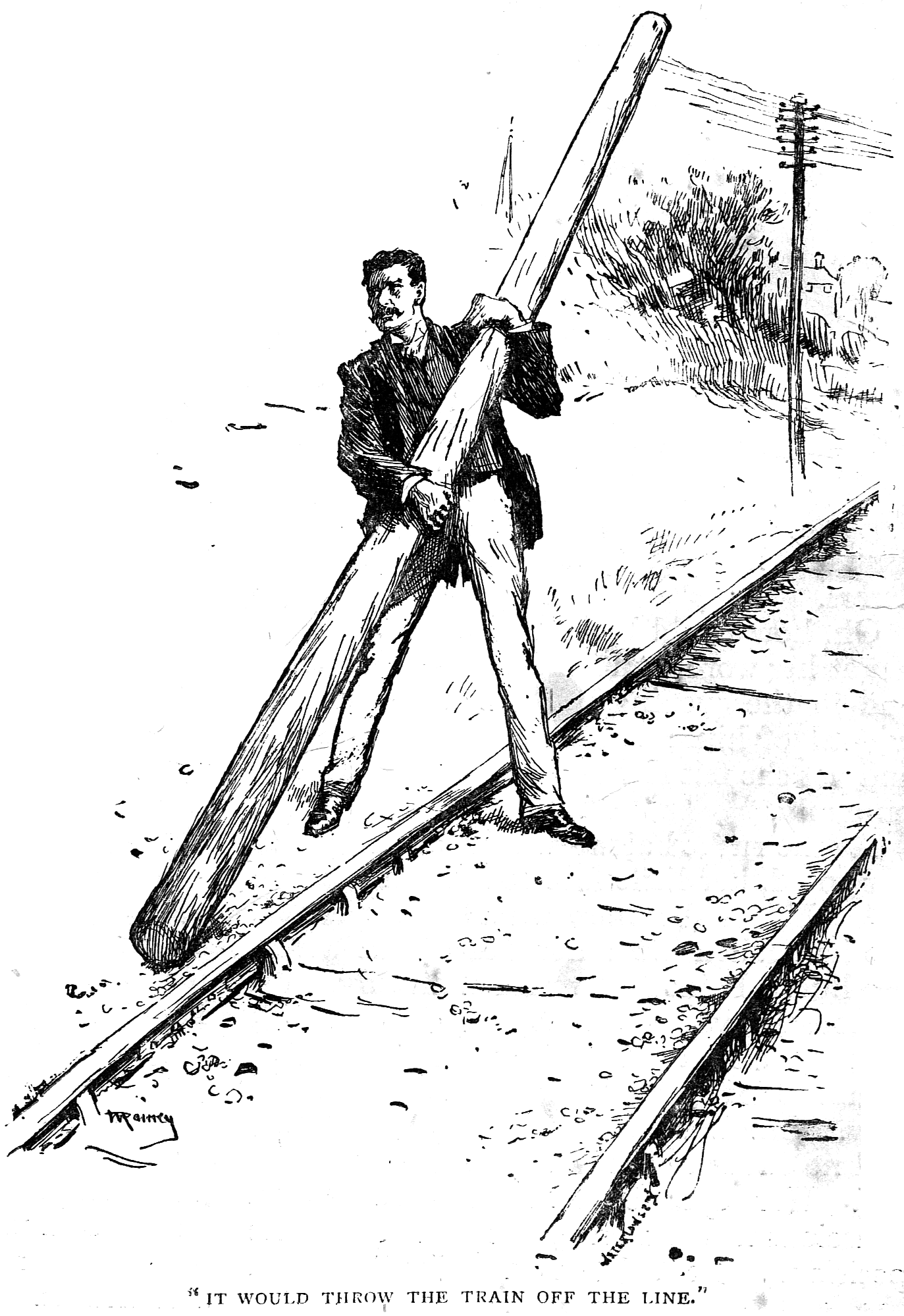
Seeing his love fallen on the track and a train approaching, he grabs a pole to derail the train

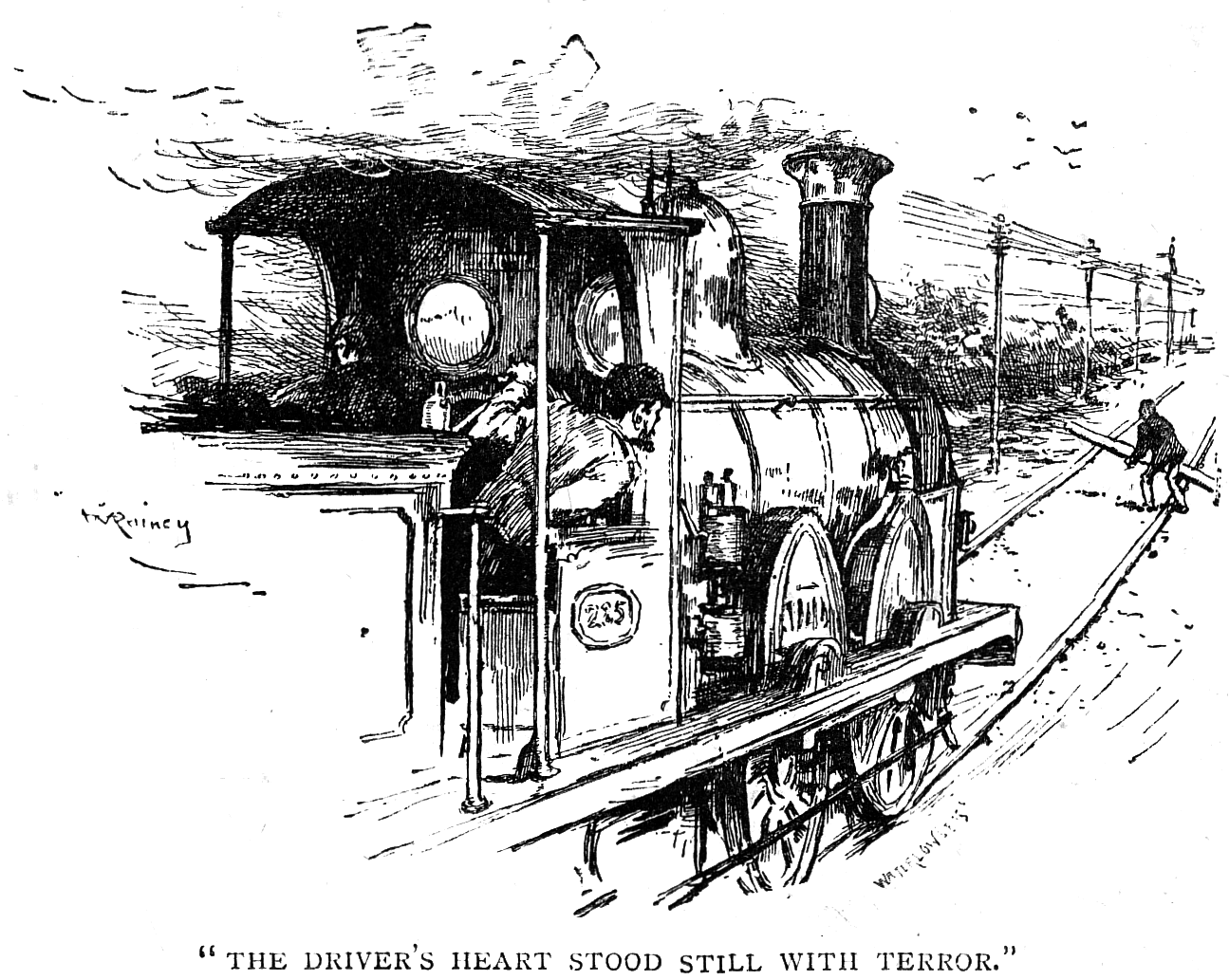
The train driver pulls the brake lever, but too late

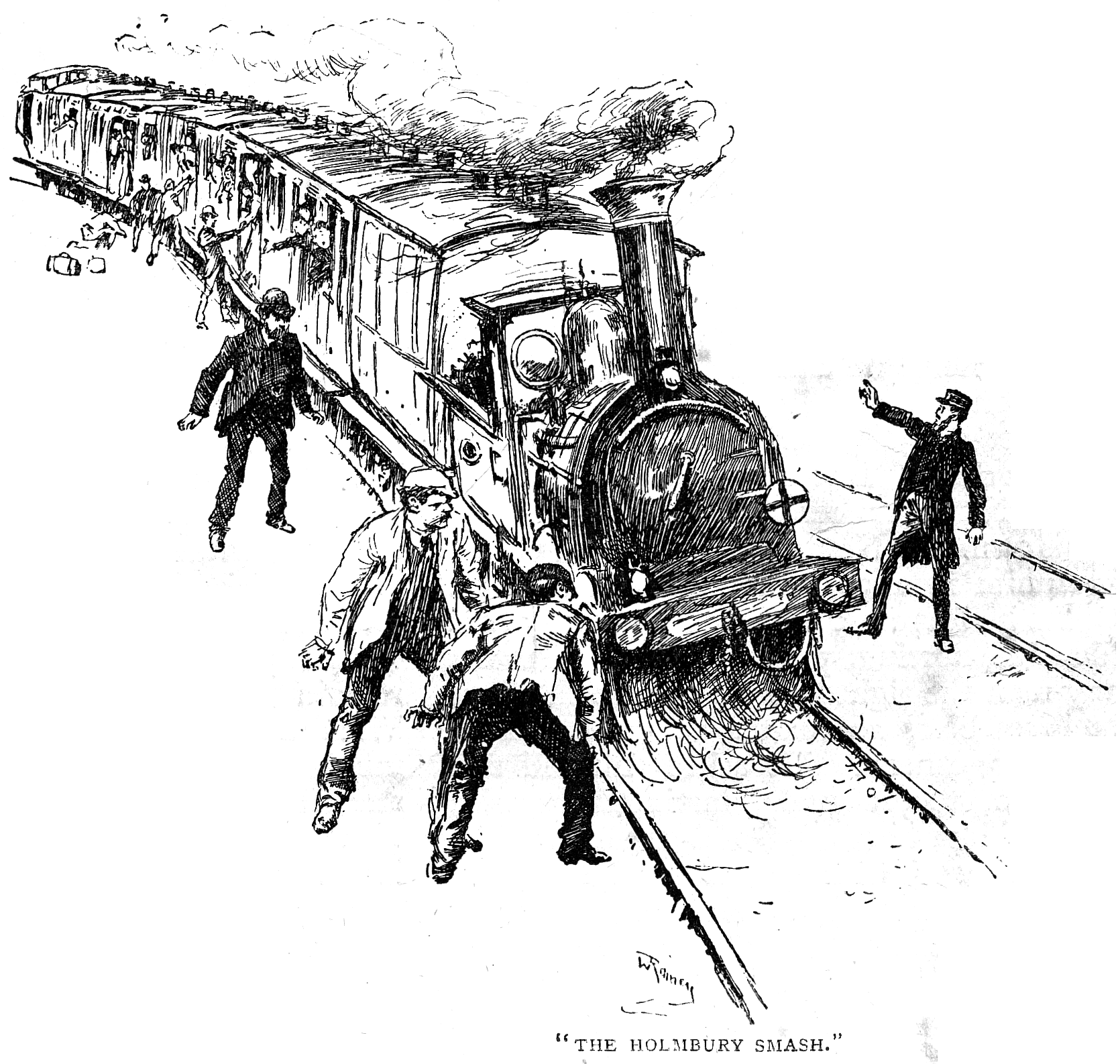
The engine derails even as he removed the pole, but no-one was hurt

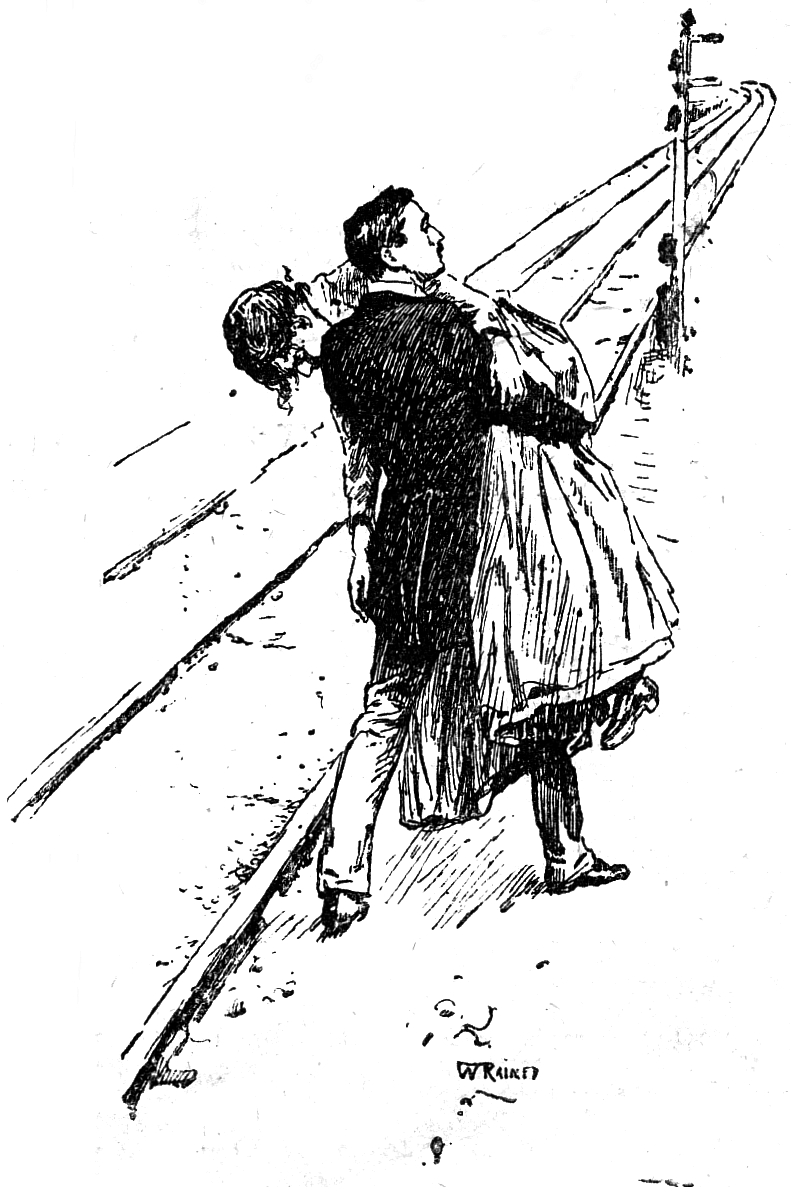
He carries off his lady love

== Book illustration ==
Rainey was a prolific book illustrator. Kirkpatrick list approximately 200 book titles illustrated by Rainey in his list on the Bear Alley blog, and update the list with a few additional titles for his book. The following list of author's whose work was illustrated by Rainey is based on Kirkpatrick.

- William Adams (1814–1848), an Anglican cleric who wrote Christian allegories.
- Helen Atteridge (1856–1931), author of children's fiction.
- Harold Avery (1867–1943), who wrote school stories for both boys and girls.
- May Baldwin (1862–1950), a British author of girls' school stories.
- F. S. Brereton (1872–1957), who wrote tales of Imperial heroism for children.
- Maggie Browne (1864–1937), Margaret Andrewes née Hamer, an English an author of both non-fiction and fiction for children.
- Ella Lyman Cabot (1866–1934), an American educator, lecturer, and author.
- Edith Carrington (1853–1929), an English animal rights activist who began to write books on animals from 1889.
- Harriet L. Childe-Pemberton (1852–1922), an English poet, short story writer, critic, playwright, and author of juvenile fiction.
- Harry Collingwood (1843–1922), a writer of boys' adventure fiction, usually in a nautical setting.
- Samuel Rutherford Crockett (1859–1914), a prolific Scottish novelist, who wrote more than 60 books.
- Daniel Defoe (c. 1659 – 1731), who wrote Robinson Crusoe and A Journal of the Plague Year among other works.
- Charles Dickens (1812–1870), for whom Jellicoe illustrated posthumous reissues.
- Sarah Doudney (1841–1926), an English poet, short story writer, best known for writing hymns and juvenile fiction.
- Henry Drummond (1851–1897), a Scottish evangelist, biologist, lecturer, and writer.
- George Manville Fenn (1831–1909), a prolific author of fiction for young adults.
- Amy Le Feuvre (1861–1929), a prolific author of books for children with a Christian message.
- John Finnemore (1863–1915), who wrote books and stories for younger readers, as well as school textbooks.
- Ernest Glanville (1855–1925), a South African author, who wrote seventeen historical novels, but is best known for his many short stories.
- Evelyn Everett-Green (1856–1932), a prolific English novelist who wrote about 350 book, beginning first with pious stories, then historical fiction for girls, and eventually moved to adult romantic fiction.
- G. A. Henty (1832–1902), a prolific writer of boy's adventure fiction, often set in a historical context, who had himself served in the military and been a war correspondent.
- Emily Sarah Holt (1836–1893), who wrote mainly on historical themes, often with a strong Protestant religious element.
- T. T. Jeans (1871–1938), a Royal Navy medical officer who wrote juvenile fiction to show boys what life in the modern navy was really like.
- E. C. Kenyon (1854–1925), Edith Caroline Kenton, published more than 50 novels, mainly juvenile fiction, and mostly with the Religious Tract Society as well as translations, biographies, and tracts.
- Skelton Kuppord (1857–1934), Sir John Adams a Scottish educationalist.
- Mary Cornwall Legh (1857–1941), a British Anglican missionary.
- Robert Leighton (1858–1934), a Scottish journalist, editor, and a prolific author of juvenile fiction and non-fiction books about dogs and their care.
- Emma Leslie (1838–1909), Emma Boultwood, wrote more than 100 books, mostly juvenile and historical titles with a Christian message.
- Charles Lever (1806–1872), an Irish author, who adventure fiction was based in part of his own experience.
- Robert Maclauchlan Macdonald (1874–1942), a Scottish traveller, prospector, and a Fellow of the Royal Scottish Geographical Society who wrote juvenile fiction.
- Bessie Marchant (1862–1941), who wrote adventure fiction featuring young female heroines.
- L. T. Meade (1844–1914), Elizabeth Thomasina Meade Smith, a prolific Irish writer of stories for girls.
- Mary Russell Mitford (1787–1855), an English author and dramatist who when young, had known Jane Austen.
- Mrs Molesworth (1839–1921), n English writer of children's stories, who also wrote adult novels under a pseudonym.
- Ruth Ogden (1853–1927), Fannie Ogden Ide, an American author of juvenile fiction.
- James Macdonald Oxley (1855–1907), a Canadian writer of juvenile fiction.
- D. H. Parry (1868–1950), David Harold Parry, who also wrote as Morton Pike and Captain Eilton Blacke, a prolific English writer of serial stories and other juvenile fiction, wrote for Chums from 1892 to 1935, from a family of painters and a painter himself, was an expert on the Napoleonic Wars.
- Hugh St. Leger (1857–1925), an English writer of juvenile fiction for boys, mostly adventure stories in a nautical setting.
- Jessie Saxby (1842–1940), a Scottish suffragist, folklorist, and author of juvenile fiction.
- Evelyn Sharp (1869–1955), an English suffragist and an author, who was well known for her juvenile fiction.
- Helen Shipton (1857–1945), wrote children's fiction with a moral, almost exclusively for the SPCK, as well as some plays in later life.
- Gordon Stables (1840–1910), a Scottish medical doctor in the Royal Navy who wrote boys' adventure fiction.
- H. de Vere Stacpoole (1863–1951), Henry De Vere Stacpoole, a prolific Irish author, now best known as the author of The Blue Lagoon.
- Edward Step (1855–1931), who wrote extensively on botany, zoology and mycology.
- Herbert Strang (1866–1958), a pair of writers producing adventure fiction for boys, both historical and modern-day.
- William Makepeace Thackeray (1811–1863), a British novelist, author and illustrator born in India, best known for Vanity Fair.
- Percy Westerman (1875–1959), a prolific author of boys' adventure fiction, many with military and naval themes.
- Frederick Whishaw (1854–1934), a Russian-born British historian, poet, musician, and author of juvenile fiction.
- Charlotte Mary Yonge (1823–1901), who became a Sunday School teacher aged seven and remained one for the next seventy one years, she wrote to promote her religious views.

=== Example of book illustration ===
Colour illustration, which had always been used for books for small children, became more and more common for books for young adults, as the process got cheaper. Rainey illustrated Plutarch's lives for boys and girls : being selected lives freely retold (1900) by W. H. Weston with 16 full-page colour plates. Novels for juveniles usually had from four to twelve plates as can be seen from publisher's catalogues at the time, anthologies, non-fiction books, and books for young children often had more.

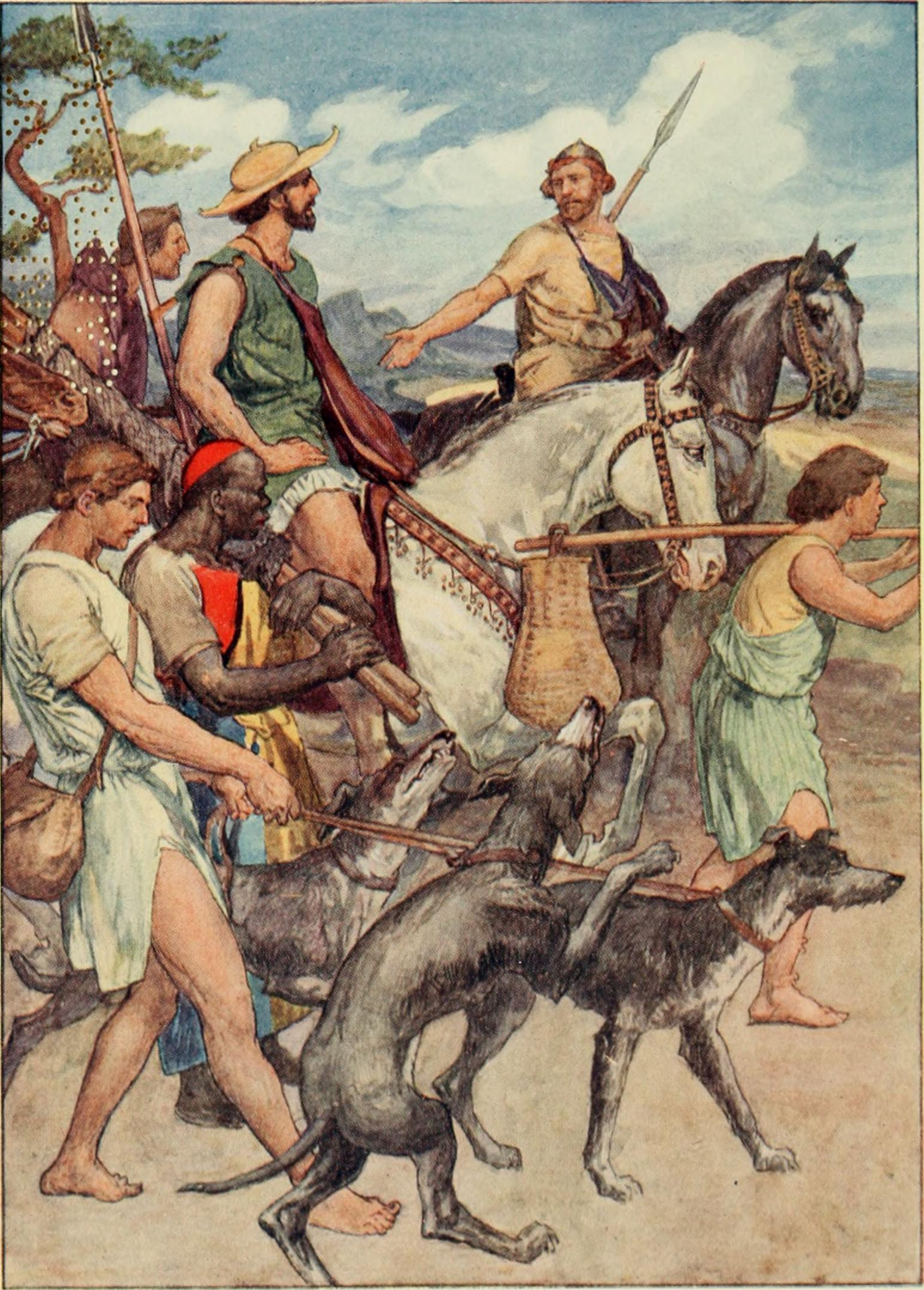
Pelopidas Setting Out for Thebes

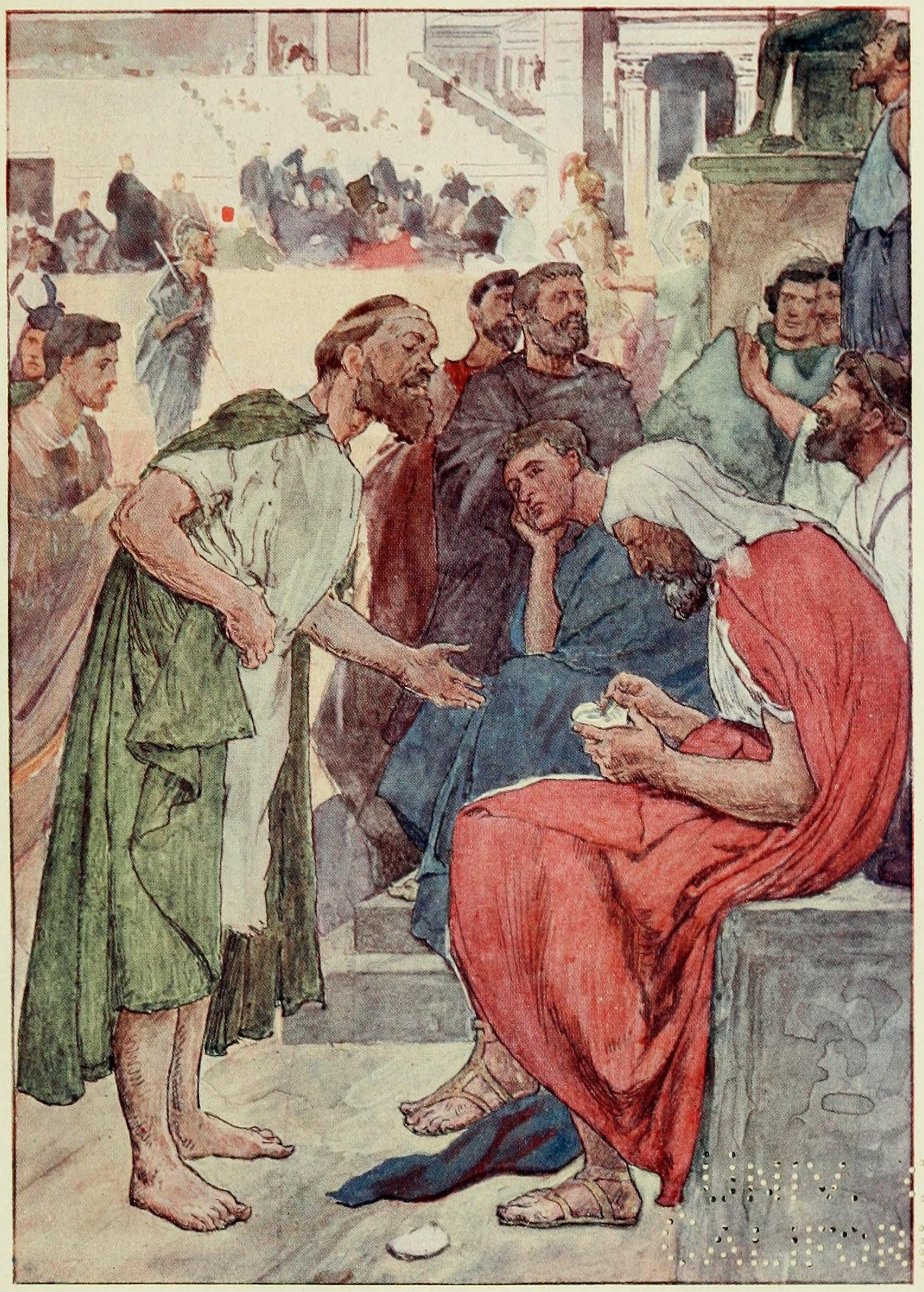
Aristides and the Citizen

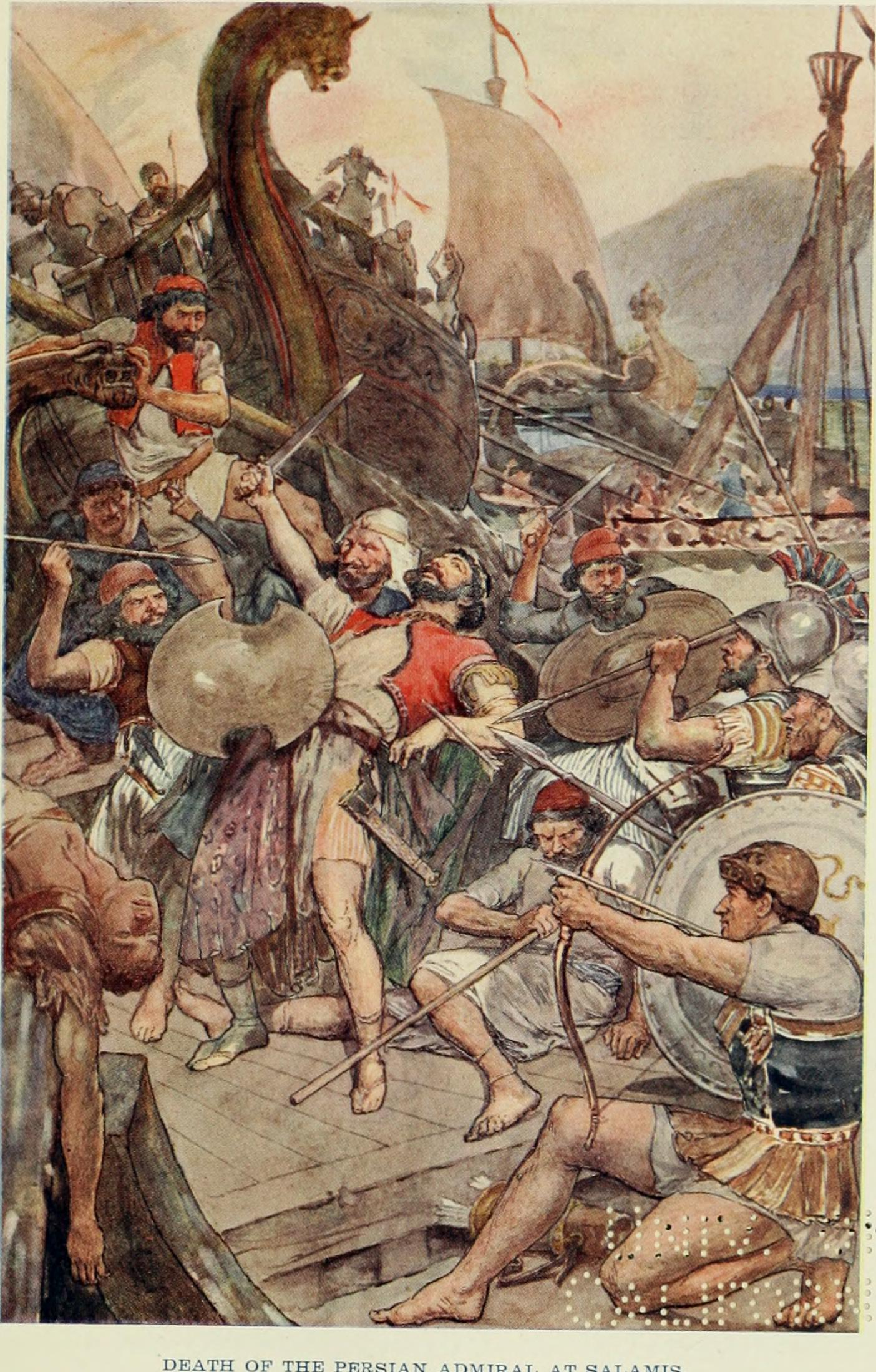
Death of the Persian Admiral at Salamis

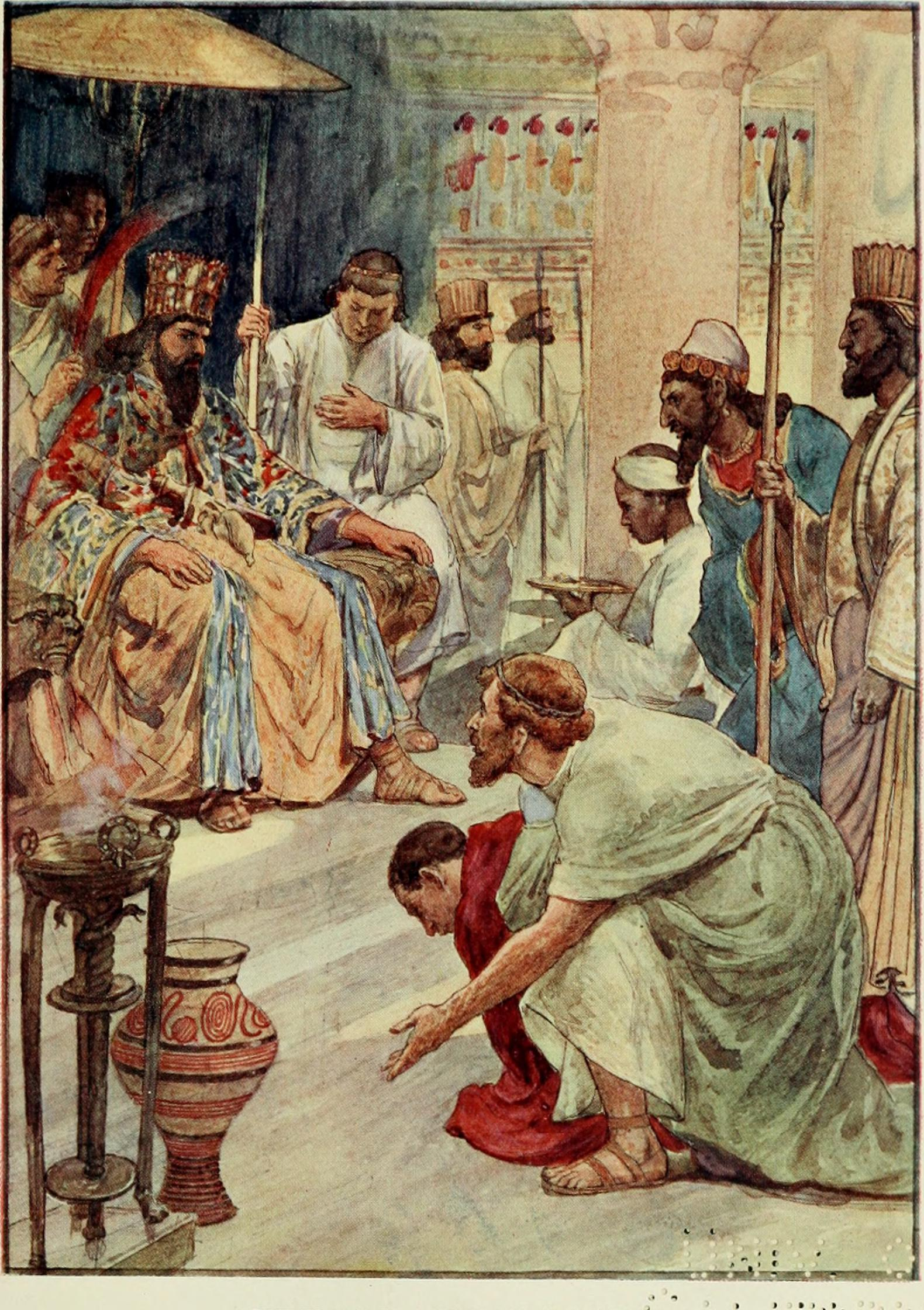
Themistocles at the Persian Court

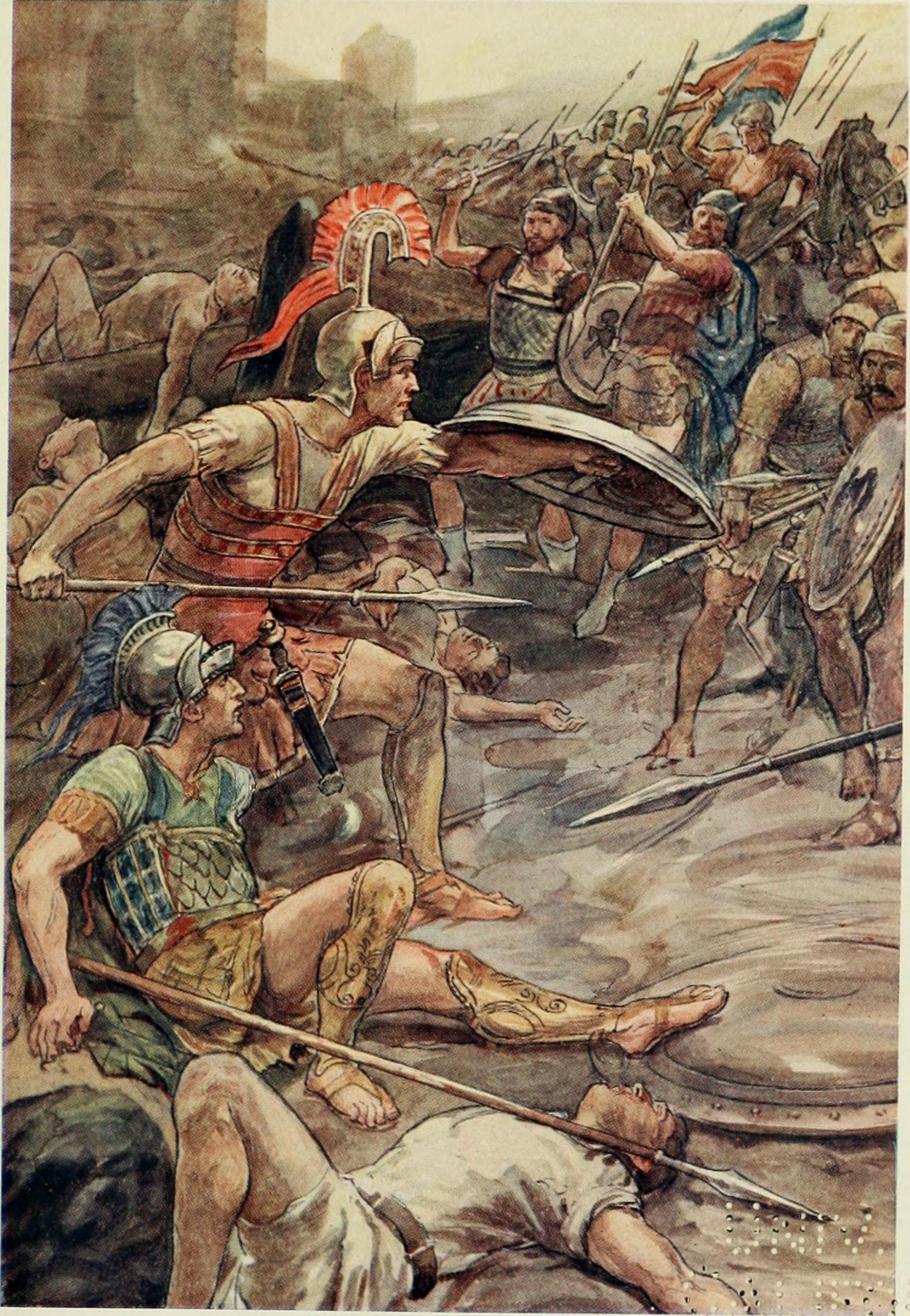
Epaminondas Defending Pelopidas

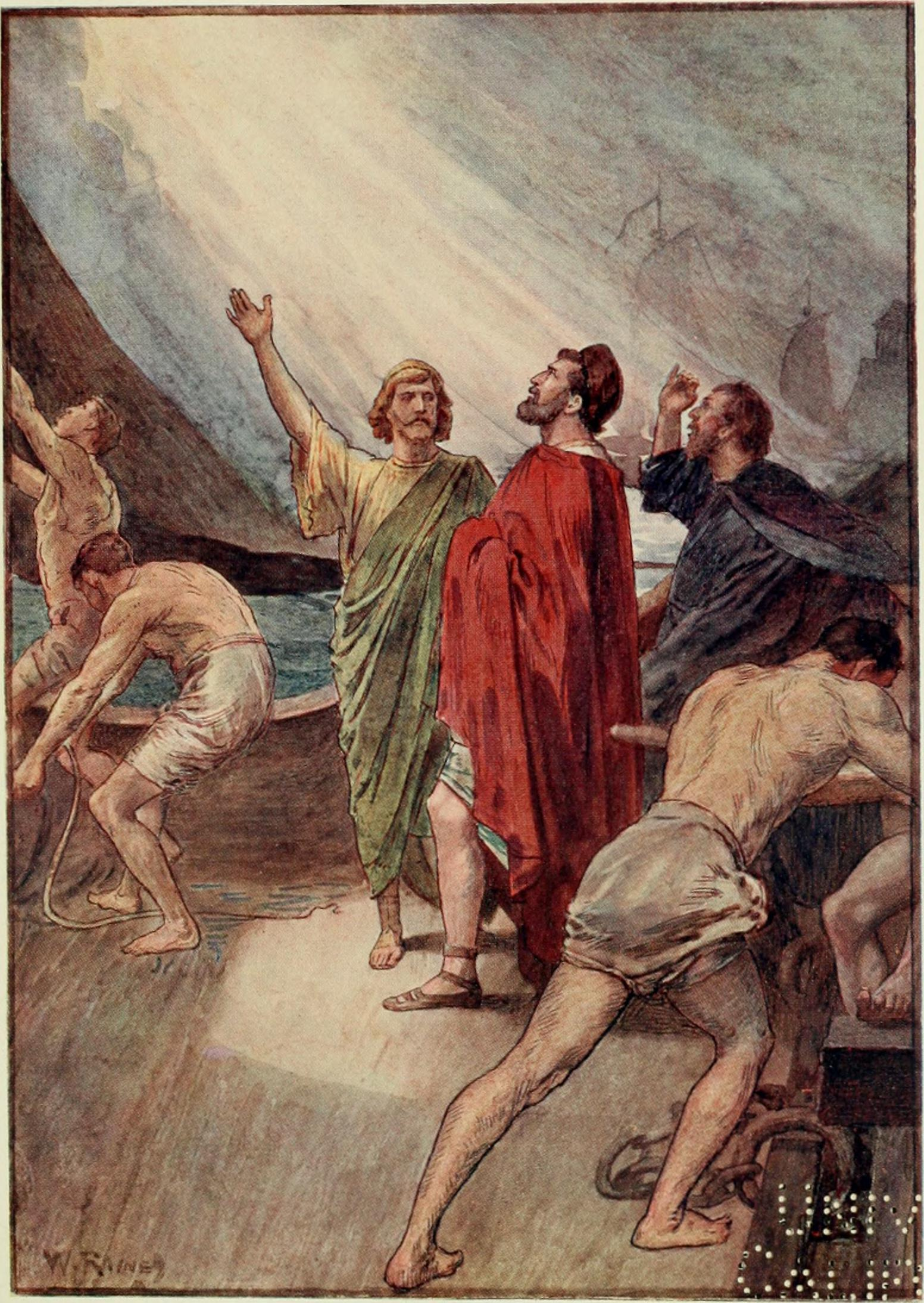
Timoleon Setting Sail For Sicily

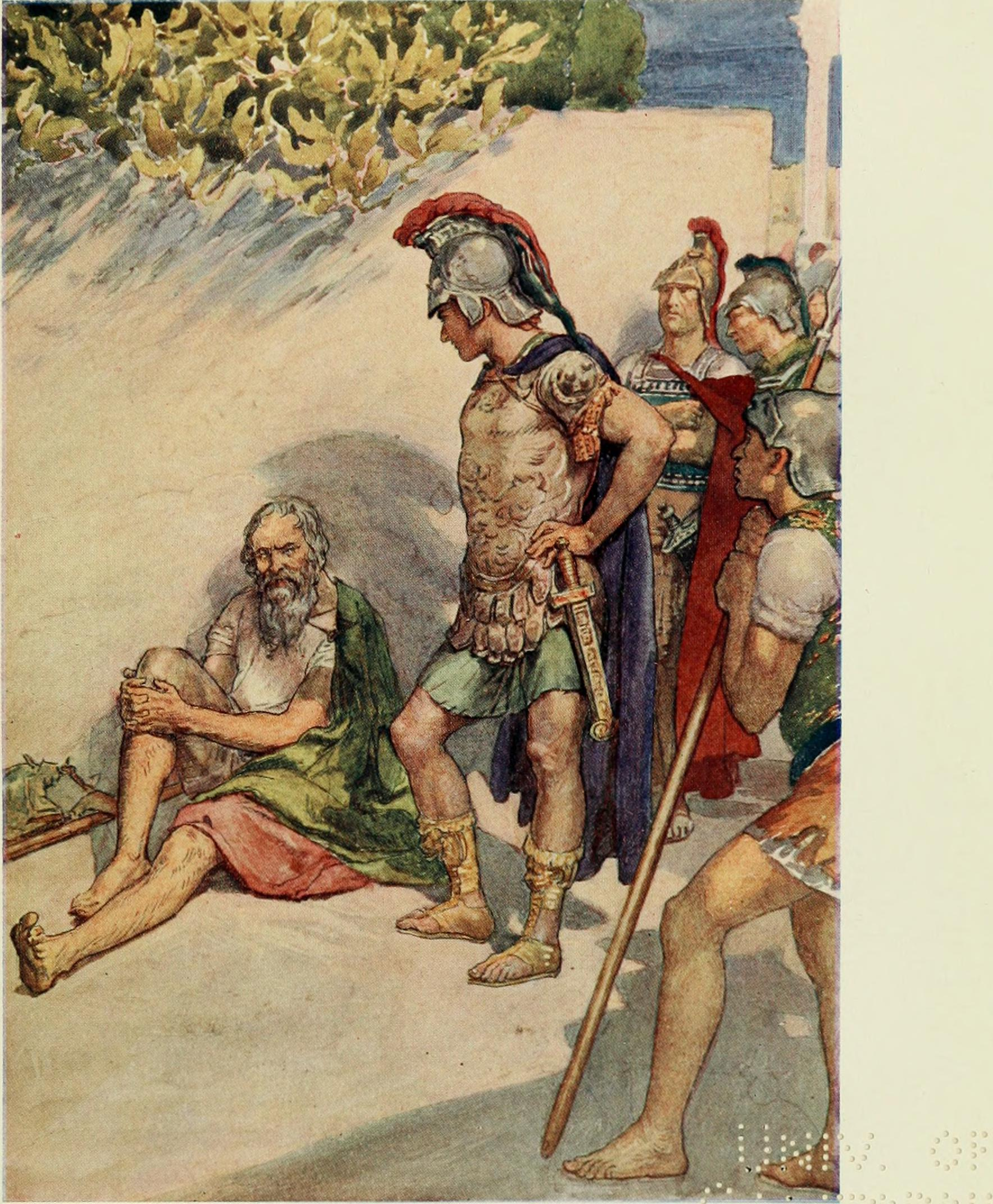
Alexander And Diogenes

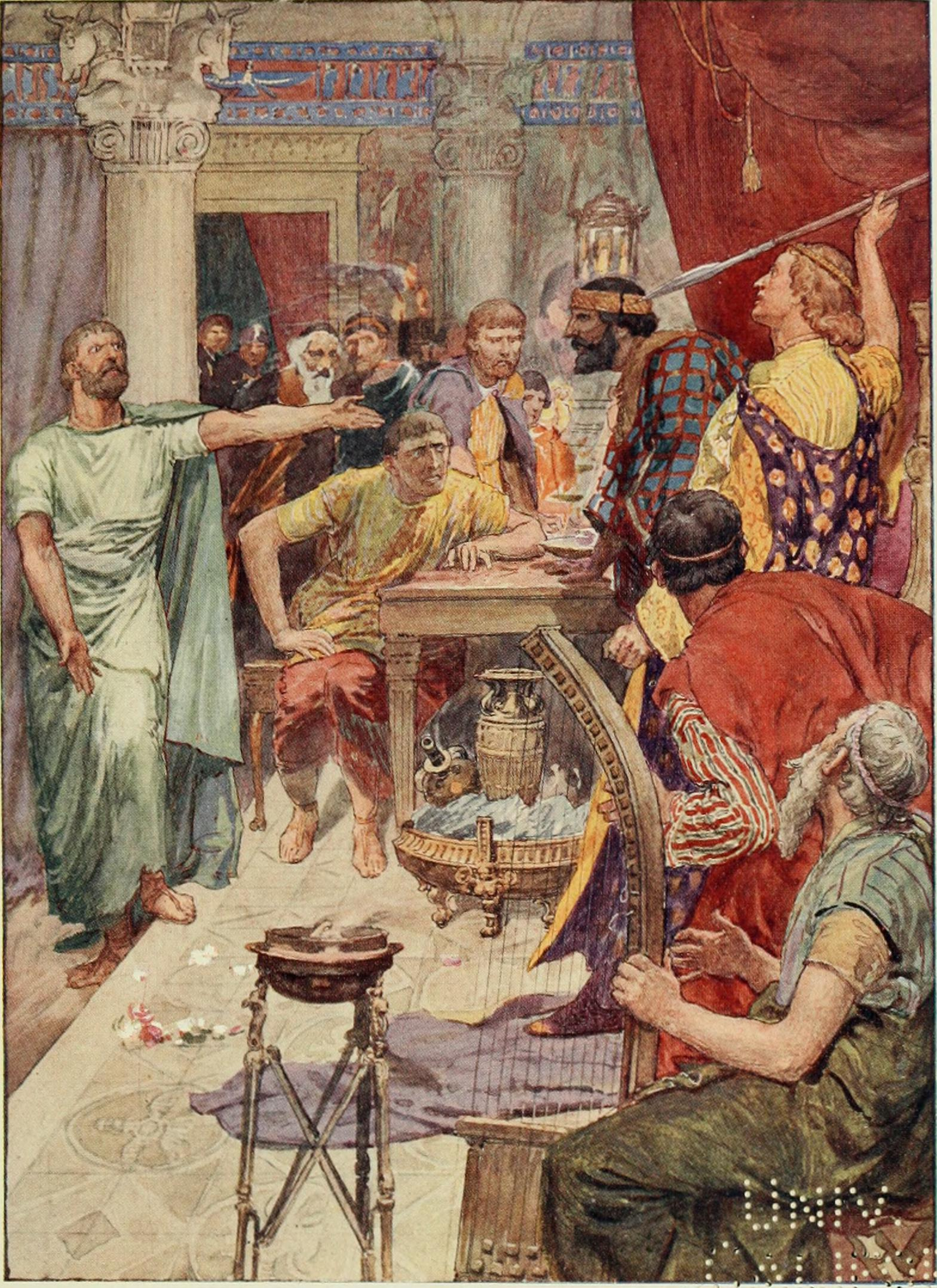
The Quarrel Between Alexander And Clitus

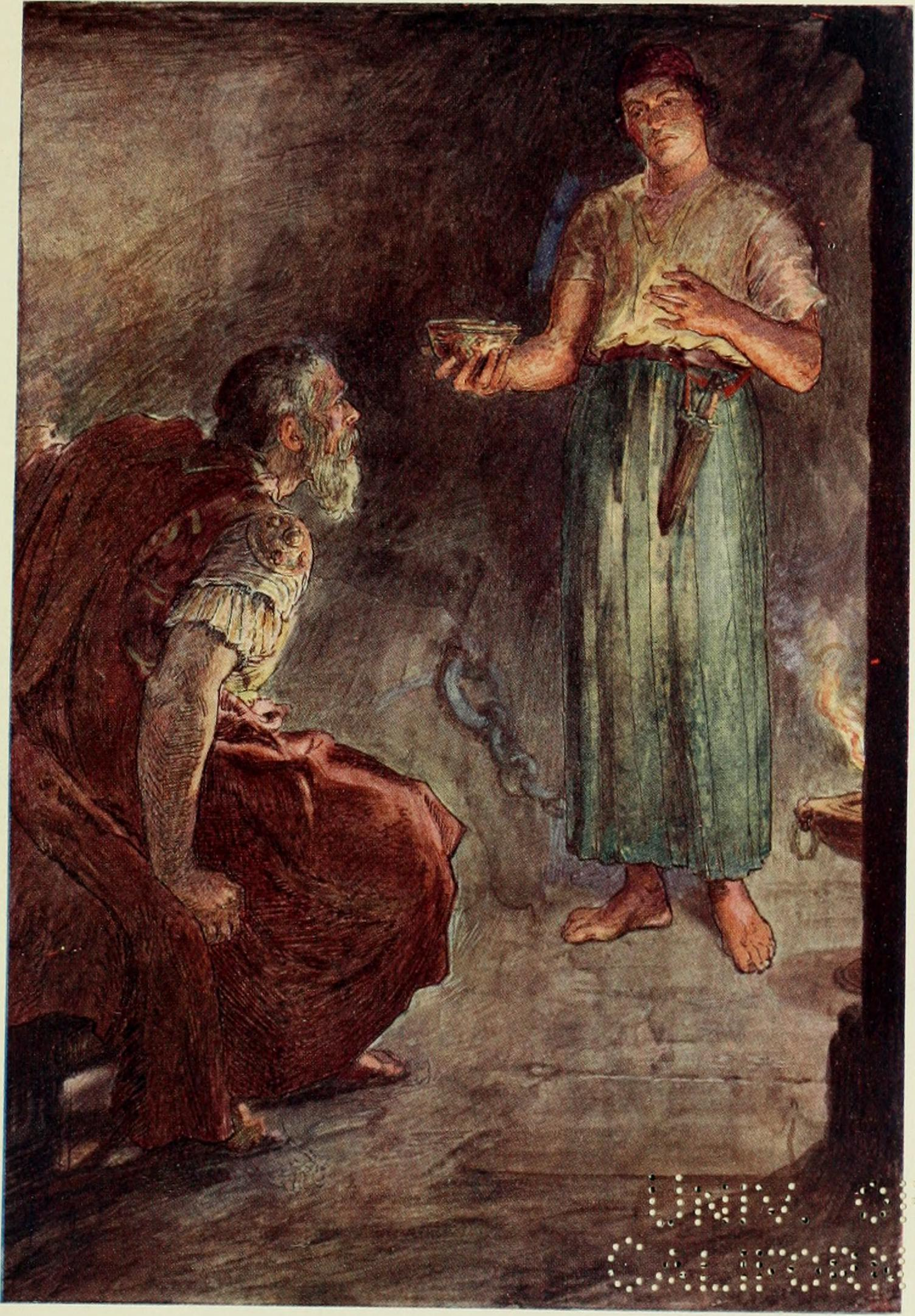
Philopoemen in Prison

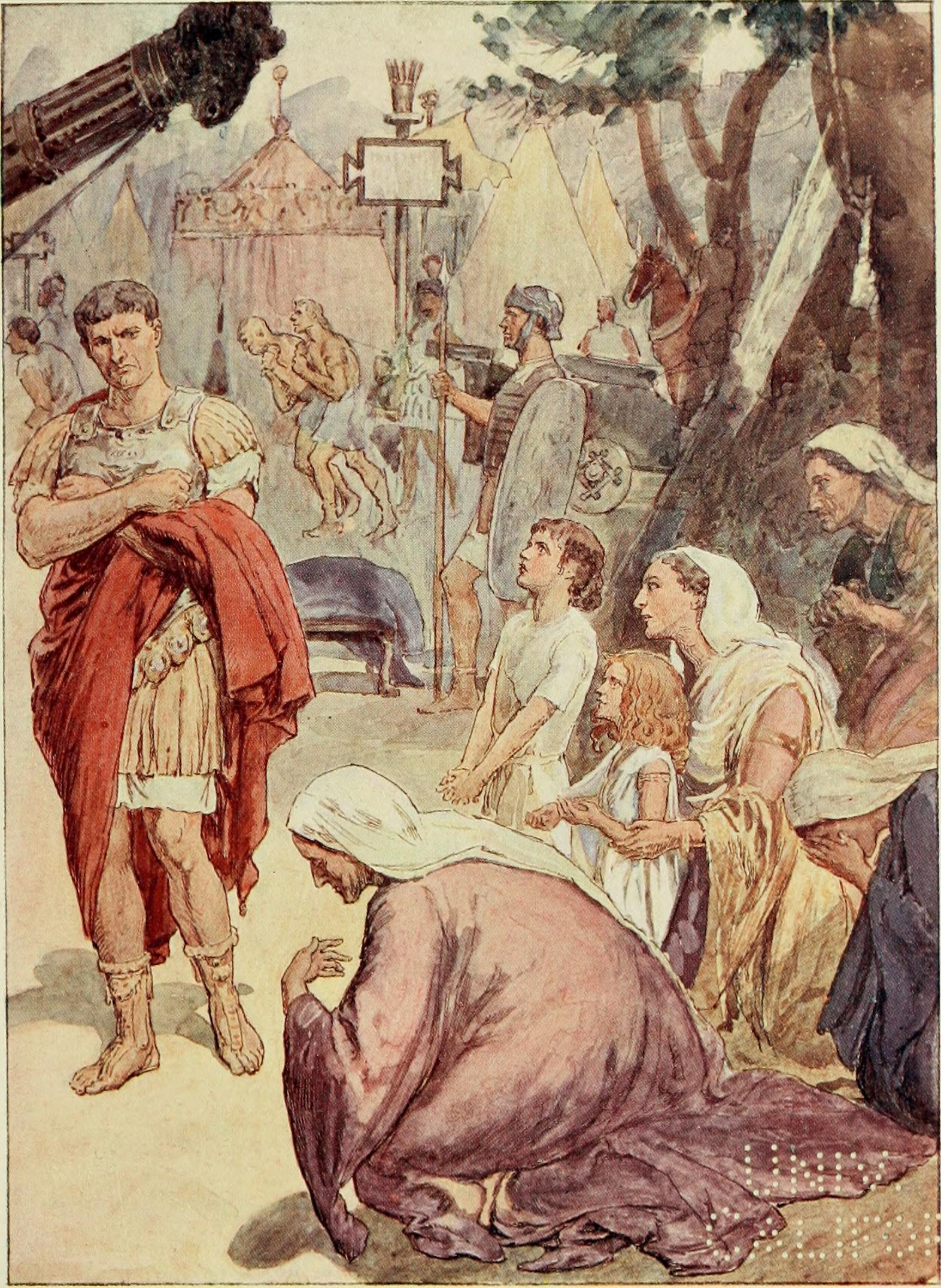
Coriolantus and the Matrons Of Rome

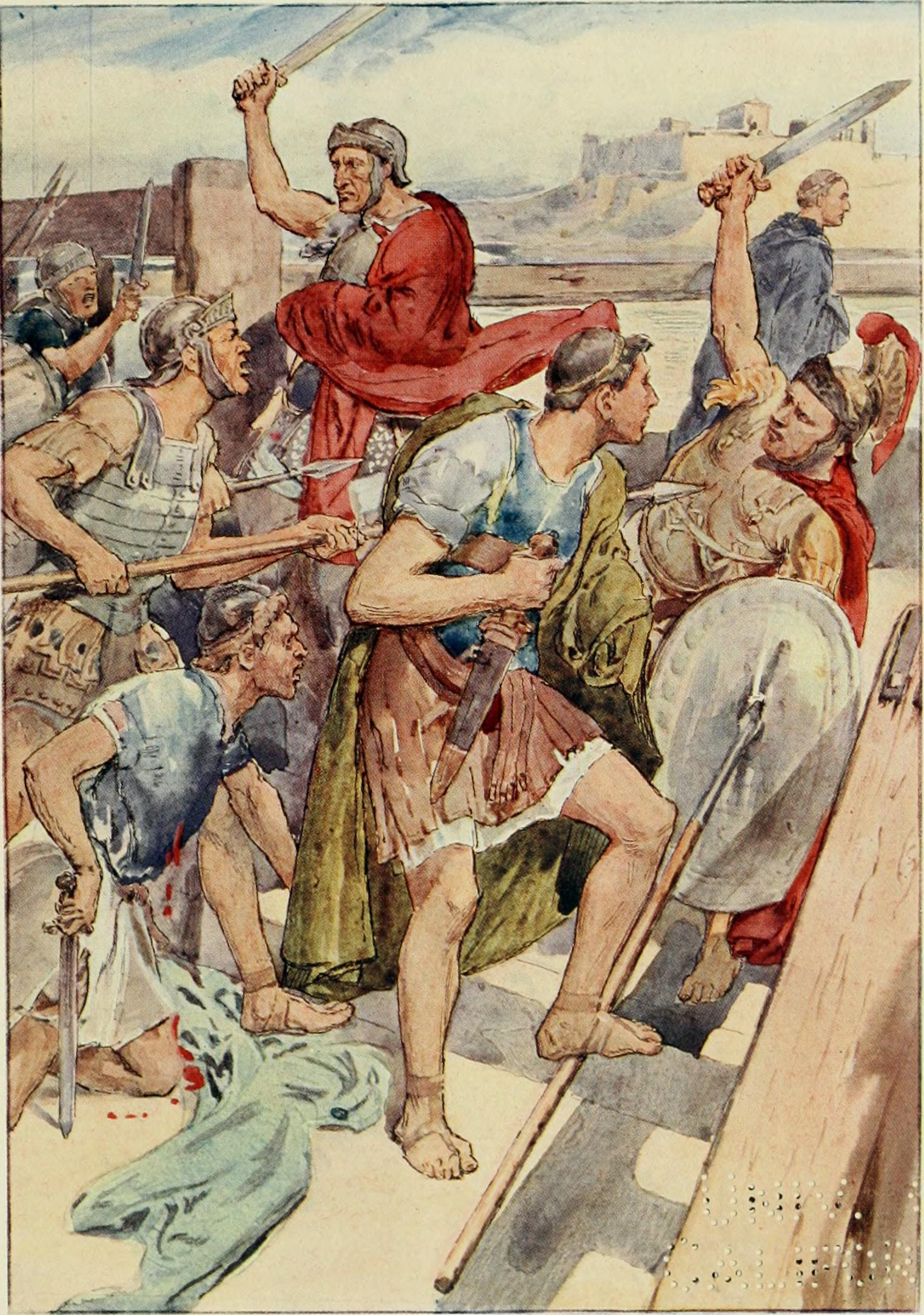
The Pursuit Of Caius Gracchus

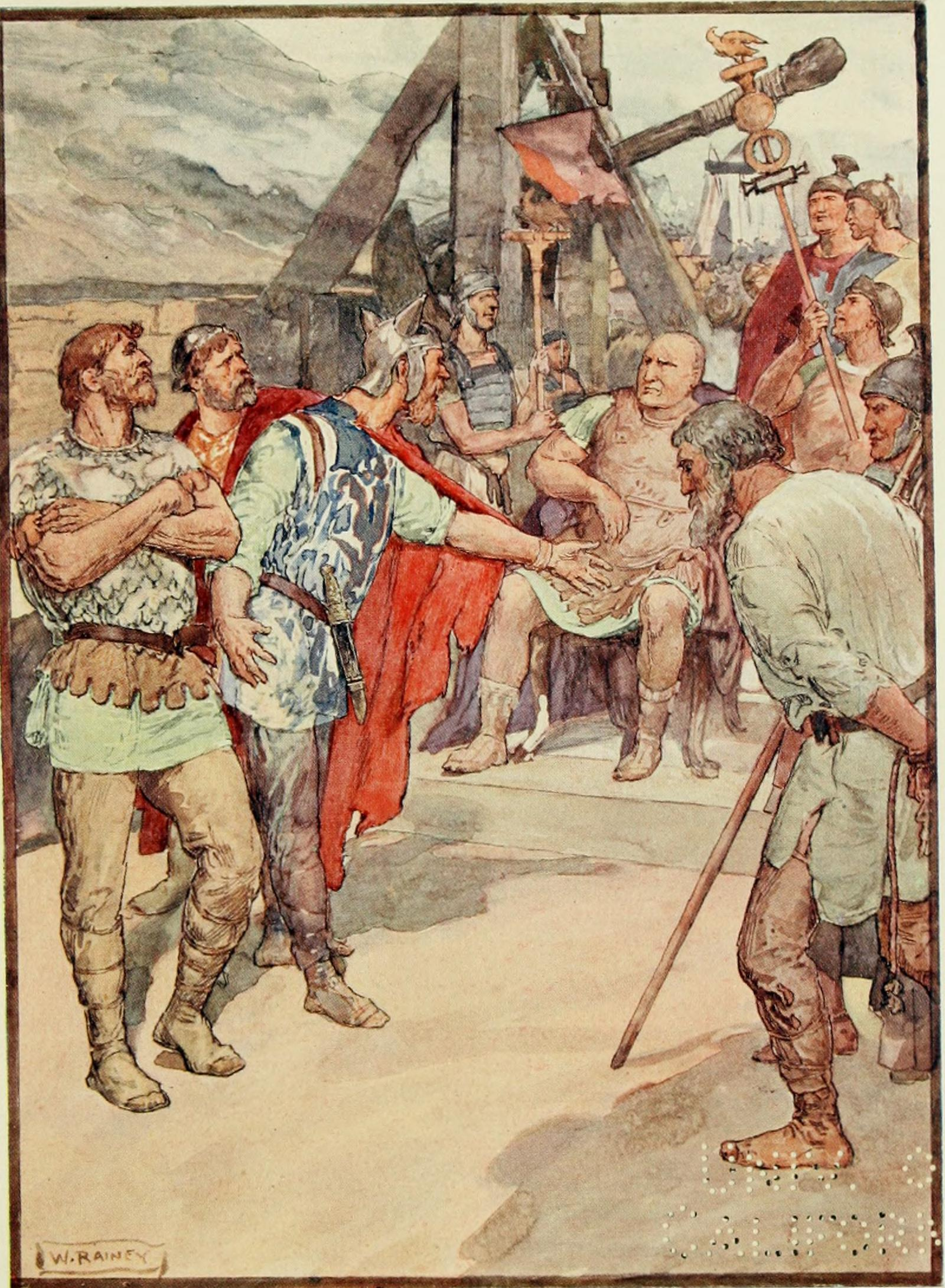
Marius and the Ambassadors of the Cimbri

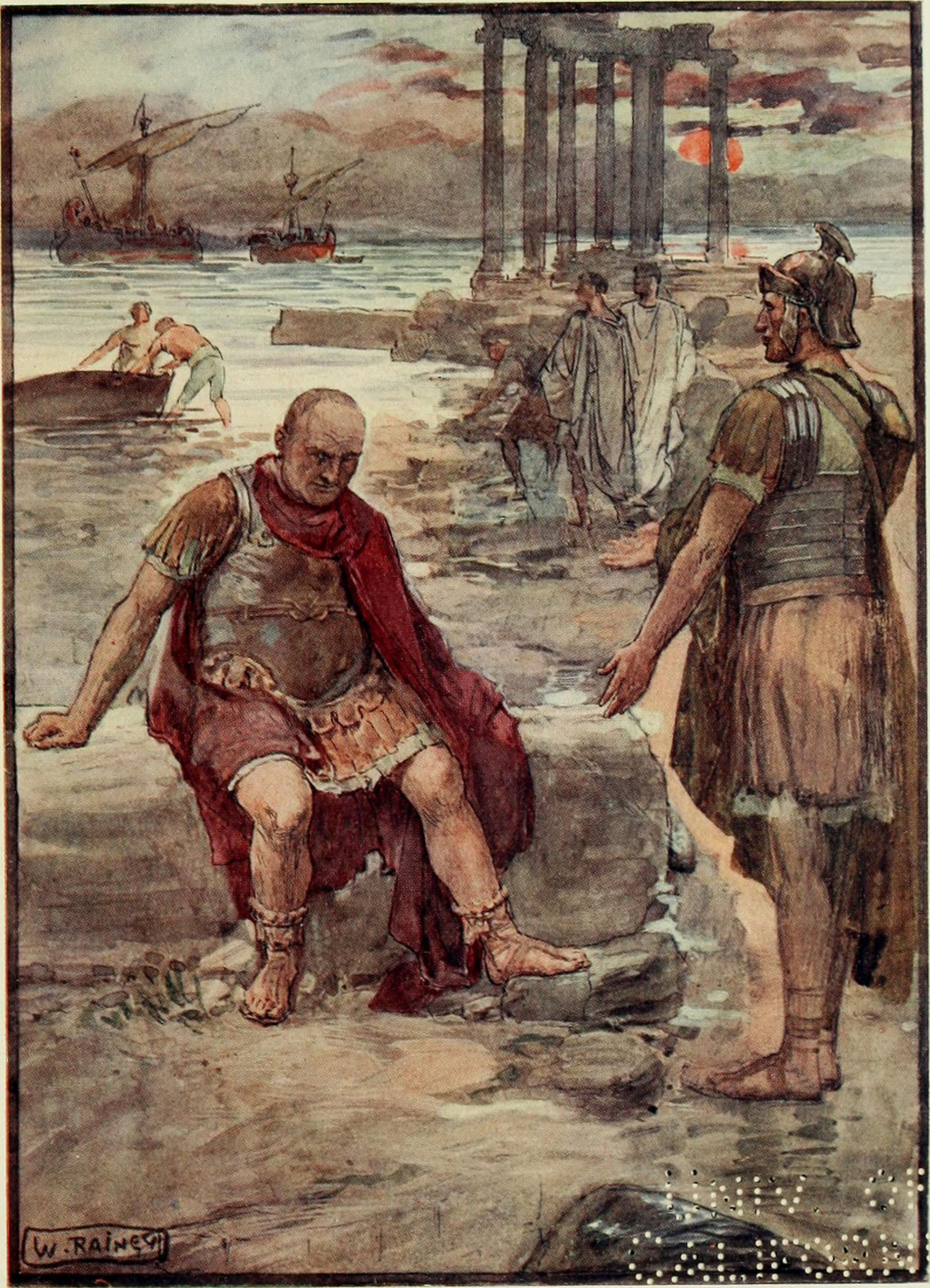
The Exiled Marius Amidst The Ruins Of Carthage

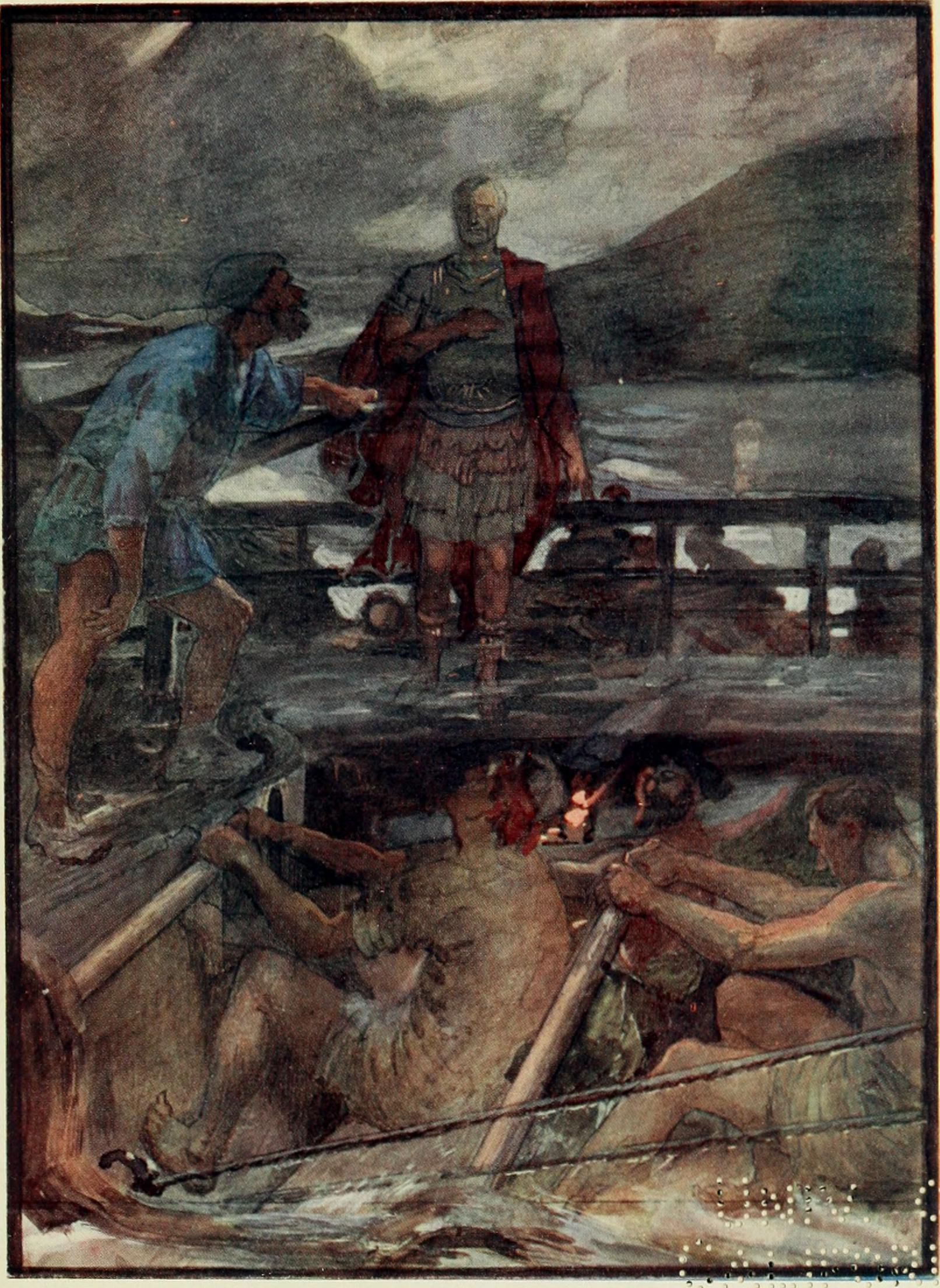
Caesar and the Pilot

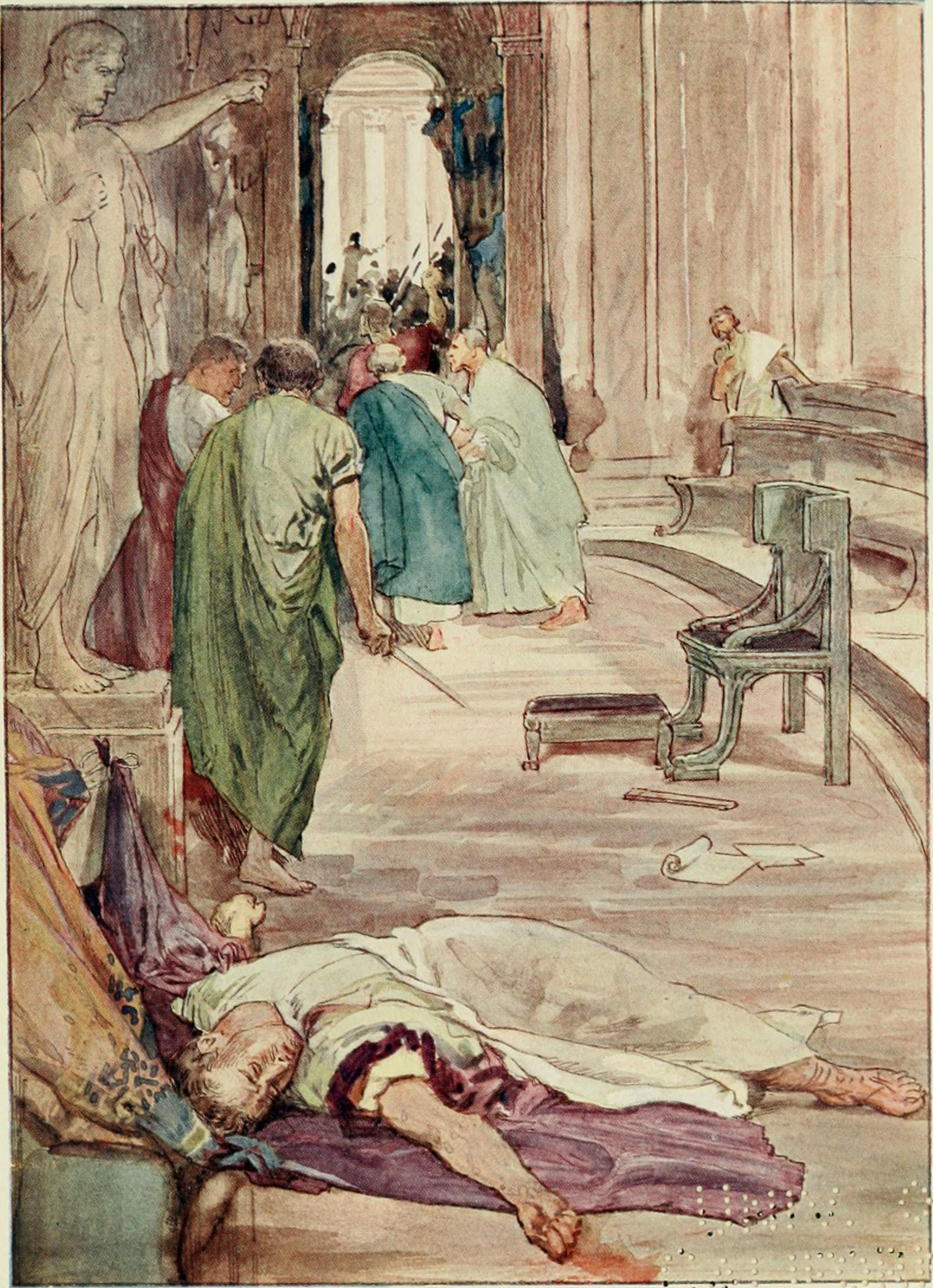
The Murder Of Caesar

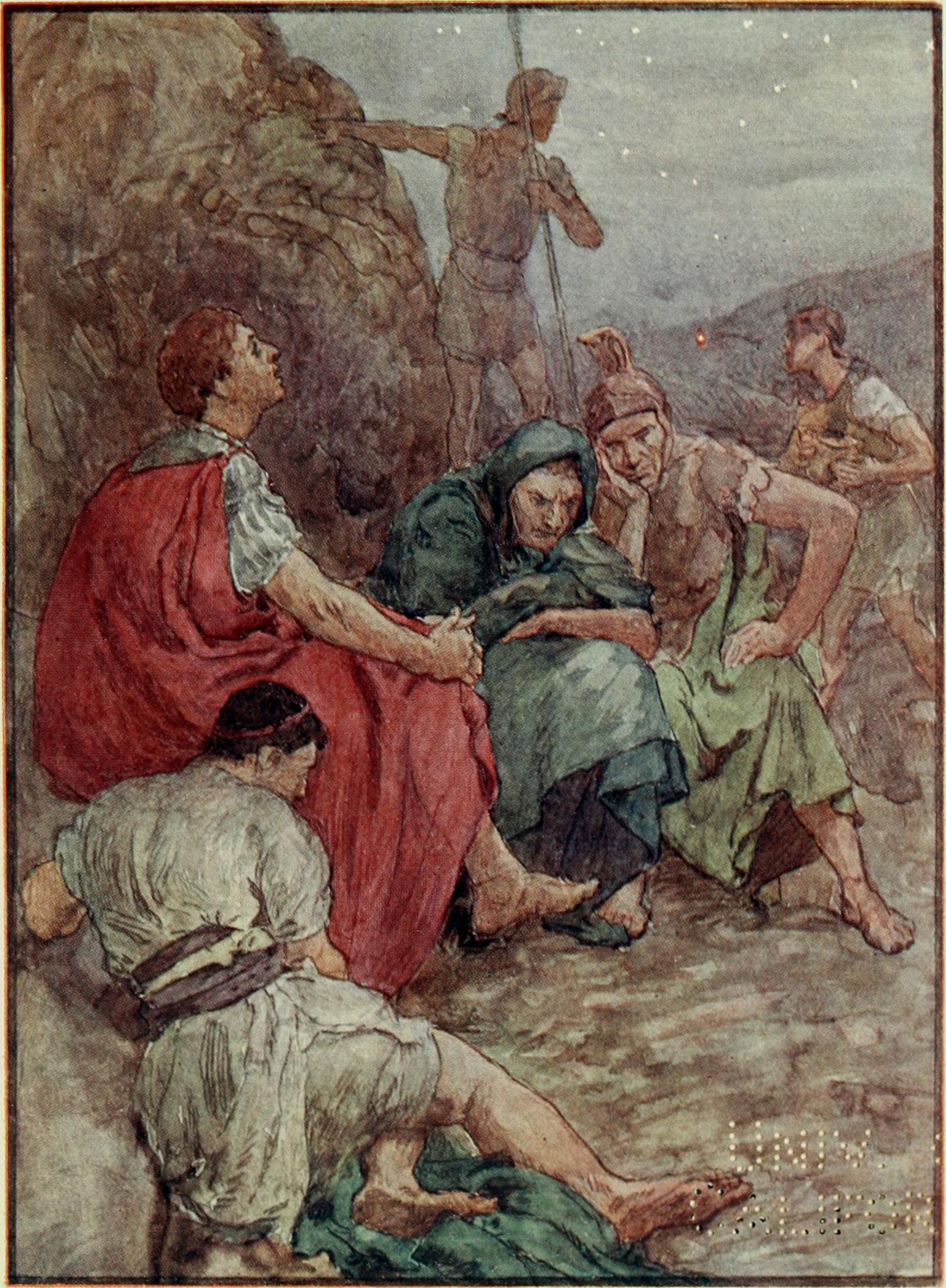
Brutus and his Companions After The Battle of Philippi

== Books written and illustrated ==
As well as the books he illustrated, Rainey also wrote and illustrated at least six books himself. Except where noted, the initial source of the following list is Kirkpatrick.

Books written and illustrated by Rainey
| No. | Year | Title | Publisher | | Notes |
|---|---|---|---|---|---|
| 1 | 1888 | All the Fun of the Fair | Ernest Nister, London | Paperback with coloured illustrations. 25 x 31 cm | Listed on Kirkpatrick as illustrator, but not as author. |
| 2 | 1900 | Abdulla: The Mystery of an Ancient Papyrus | Wells Gardner, Darton & Co., London | 318 pages, 4 unnumbered leaves of plates : illustrations; 20 cm | |
| 3 | 1929 | The Last Voyage of the "Jane Ann" | Blackie & Son, London | 208 p., [4] leaves of plates : ill.; 19 cm. | |
| 4 | 1937 | The Lost "Reynolds" | Wells Gardner, Darton & Co., London | 308 pages | Serialised in John Erskine Clarke's Chatterbox in 1920 |
| 5 | 1938 | Who's on my side: A tale for boys | Wells Gardner, Darton & Co., London | 252 pages, octavo | |
| 6 | 1938 | Admiral Rodney's Bantam Cock: A Story for boys | Wells Gardner, Darton & Co., London | 192p. 19 cm | |

== Assessment ==
Pennell says that, in his work, Rainey united the best traditions of the old with the most modern developments. Pennell also listed Rainey among those artists whose names, like their works, are household words and who have a power of rendering events of the day in a fashion unequalled elsewhere.

Peppin stated that His delicate brush strokes reproduced well in both colour and halftone. She also noted that Thorpe considered him a great but unrecognised illustrator who was ‘never conventional in his designs, had a fine sense of character, and maintained the interest throughout the whole of the drawing. Newbolt noted that Rainey He had a long and successful career as a book illustrator, which continued right up to the end of his life. His obituary in stated that many a small boy who has gazed with speechless admiration at some new gift book has been unconsciously grateful to Mr Rainey, for a great deal of his early work was the illustrating of boys' books.

Rainey attracts relatively modest prices at auction. The following are the auction prices recorded by Bénézit for works by Rainey:

- London, 3 July 1979, Preparing the Coronation Day {oil on canvas, 60x90 cm) 2,500 GBP.
- London, 26 May 1983, Paddling (watercolour/pencil outlines heightened with white, 38x51 cm) 950 GBP
- London 19 December 1991, Game of Cards in a Dutch Lodging House (1895, watercolour and gouache, 69.2x55.8 cm} 1,540 GBP
- London, 3 June 1994, Preparing the Coronation Day, Chichester (oil on canvas, 61x91.4 cm) 3,220 GBP
