= December 8 =

December 8 this year in various calendars
- Tuesday, 8 December 2026
Akan	Nwonabene
Armenian	21 Kʿaloch 1476
Aztec	Tozoztontli 7, 8 Xōchitl
Babylonian	27 Arakhsamna, 2337 SE
Balinese pawukon	Luang, Pepet, Beteng, Laba, Wage, Aryang, Anggara of Gumbreg, Brahma, Tulus, Raja
Bengali	23 Ogrohayon, BS 1433
Chinese	Yang Fire Dragon・Wings Mansion; Fire Horse Year, Month 10, Day 30 (Daxue, 14 days until Dongzhi)
Common Era	8 December 2026 CE
Coptic	29 Hathor, AM 1743
Egyptian	26 Pharmuthi, 2775 NE
Ethiopian	29 H̱edār, 2019 Amätä Məhrät
French Republican	Décade II, Septidi de Frimaire de l'Année 235 de la République
Gregorian	8 December, AD 2026
Hebrew	28 Kislev, AM 5787
Hindu	Anurādhā・Sukarman; Solar: 22 Mārgaśīrṣa, 1948 SE; Lunisolar: Amāvasyā, Kṛishna pakṣa of Kārtika, 2083 VE; Rāudra・5127 KY・1,872,917
Icelandic	Þriðjudagur, 16 Ýlir 2026
Islamic	27 Jumada al-thani, AH 1448 (using tabular method)
ISO week date	2026-W50-2
Japanese	30 Kannazuki, Reiwa 8 (Taisetsu, 14 days until Tōji)
Julian	25 November, AD 2026 (AM 7535)
Julian day	2461383
Korean	30 Dwaejidal, 4359 DE
Maya	13.0.14.3.0; 13 Mac, 8 Ahau
Roman	ante diem VII Kalendas Decembres, MMDCCLXXIX AUC
Solar Hijri	17 Azar, SH 1405
Tibetan	30 smin drug, me pho rta 2153 or 1772 or 1000

<<	December					>>
Su	Mo	Tu	We	Th	Fr	Sa
		1	2	3	4	5
6	7	8	9	10	11	12
13	14	15	16	17	18	19
20	21	22	23	24	25	26
27	28	29	30	31
2026

December 8 in recent years
2025 (Monday)
2024 (Sunday)
2023 (Friday)
2022 (Thursday)
2021 (Wednesday)
2020 (Tuesday)
2019 (Sunday)
2018 (Saturday)
2017 (Friday)
2016 (Thursday)

December 8 is the 342nd day of the year (343rd in leap years) in the Gregorian calendar; 23 days remain until the end of the year.

== Events ==
=== Pre-1600 ===
- 395 – Later Yan is defeated by its former vassal Northern Wei at the Battle of Canhe Slope.
- 757 – The poet Du Fu returns to Chang'an as a member of Emperor Xuanzong's court, after having escaped the city during the An Lushan Rebellion.
- 877 – Louis the Stammerer (son of Charles the Bald) is crowned king of the West Frankish Kingdom at Compiègne.
- 1504 – Ahmad ibn Abi Jum'ah writes his Oran fatwa, arguing for the relaxation of Islamic law requirements for the forcibly converted Muslims in Spain.

=== 1601–1900 ===
- 1660 – A woman (either Margaret Hughes or Anne Marshall) appears on an English public stage for the first time, in the role of Desdemona in a production of Shakespeare's play Othello.
- 1851 – Conservative Santiago-based government troops defeat rebels at the Battle of Loncomilla, signaling the end of the 1851 Chilean Revolution.
- 1854 – In his Apostolic constitution Ineffabilis Deus, Pope Pius IX proclaims the dogmatic definition of Immaculate Conception, which holds that the Blessed Virgin Mary was conceived free of Original Sin.
- 1863 – Between two and three thousand churchgoers die in the Church of the Company Fire, possibly the largest single building fire by number of victims in modern history.
- 1864 – Pope Pius IX promulgates the encyclical Quanta cura and its appendix, the Syllabus of Errors, outlining the authority of the Catholic Church and condemning various liberal ideas.

=== 1901–present ===
- 1907 – King Gustaf V of Sweden accedes to the Swedish throne.
- 1912 – Leaders of the German Empire hold an Imperial War Council to discuss the possibility that war might break out.
- 1914 – World War I: A squadron of Britain's Royal Navy defeats the Imperial German East Asia Squadron in the Battle of the Falkland Islands in the South Atlantic.
- 1922 – Two days after coming into existence, the Irish Free State executes four leaders of the Irish Republican Army: Dick Barrett, Joe McKelvey, Liam Mellows and Rory O'Connor.
- 1933 – Anarchist insurrection breaks out in Zaragoza, Spain.
- 1941 – World War II: U.S. President Franklin D. Roosevelt declares December 7 to be "a date which will live in infamy", after which the U.S. declares war on Japan.
- 1941 – World War II: Japanese forces simultaneously invade Shanghai International Settlement, Malaya, Thailand, Hong Kong, the Philippines, and the Dutch East Indies. (See December 7 for the concurrent attack on Pearl Harbor in the Western Hemisphere.)
- 1943 – World War II: The German 117th Jäger Division destroys the monastery of Mega Spilaio in Greece and executes 22 monks and visitors as part of reprisals that culminated a few days later with the Massacre of Kalavryta.
- 1953 – U.S. President Dwight D. Eisenhower delivers his "Atoms for Peace" speech, which leads to an American program to supply equipment and information on nuclear power to schools, hospitals, and research institutions around the world.
- 1955 – The Flag of Europe is adopted by Council of Europe.
- 1962 – Workers at four New York City newspapers (this later increases to nine) go on strike for 114 days.
- 1963 – Pan Am Flight 214, a Boeing 707, is struck by lightning and crashes near Elkton, Maryland, killing all 81 people on board.
- 1966 – The Greek ship SS Heraklion sinks in a storm in the Aegean Sea, killing over 200.
- 1969 – Olympic Airways Flight 954 strikes a mountain outside of Keratea, Greece, killing 90 people in the worst crash of a Douglas DC-6 in history.
- 1971 – Indo-Pakistani War: The Indian Navy launches an attack on West Pakistan's port city of Karachi.
- 1972 – United Airlines Flight 553, a Boeing 737, crashes after aborting its landing attempt at Chicago Midway International Airport, killing 45. This is the first-ever loss of a Boeing 737.
- 1974 – A plebiscite results in the abolition of monarchy in Greece.
- 1980 – John Lennon is murdered by Mark David Chapman in front of The Dakota in New York City.
- 1985 – The South Asian Association for Regional Cooperation, the regional intergovernmental organization and geopolitical union in South Asia, is established.
- 1987 – Cold War: The Intermediate-Range Nuclear Forces Treaty is signed by U.S. President Ronald Reagan and Soviet leader Mikhail Gorbachev in the White House.
- 1987 – An Israeli army tank transporter kills four Palestinian refugees and injures seven others during a traffic accident at the Erez Crossing on the Israel–Gaza Strip border, which has been cited as one of the events which sparked the First Intifada.
- 1988 – A United States Air Force A-10 Thunderbolt II crashes into an apartment complex in Remscheid, Germany, killing five people and injuring 50 others.
- 1991 – The leaders of Russia, Belarus and Ukraine sign an agreement dissolving the Soviet Union and establishing the Commonwealth of Independent States.
- 1998 – Eighty-one people are killed by armed groups in Algeria.
- 2001 – A raid conducted by the Internal Security Department (ISD) of Singapore foils a Jemaah Islamiyah (JI) plot to bomb foreign embassies in Singapore.
- 2004 – The Cusco Declaration is signed in Cusco, Peru, establishing the South American Community of Nations.
- 2004 – Columbus nightclub shooting: Nathan Gale opens fire at the Alrosa Villa nightclub in Columbus, Ohio, killing former Pantera guitarist Dimebag Darrell and three others before being shot dead by a police officer.
- 2009 – Bombings in Baghdad, Iraq kill 127 people and injure 448 others.
- 2010 – With the second launch of the Falcon 9, and the first launch of the Dragon, SpaceX becomes the first private company to successfully launch, orbit and recover a spacecraft.
- 2010 – The Japanese solar-sail spacecraft IKAROS passes the planet Venus at a distance of about 80,800 km (50,200 mi).
- 2013 – Riots break out in Singapore, after a fatal accident in Little India.
- 2013 – Metallica performs a show in Antarctica, making them the first musical act to perform on all seven continents.
- 2019 – First confirmed case of COVID-19 in China.
- 2024 – Damascus falls to rebels after Syrian troops withdraw and president Bashar al-Assad leaves the country as his government collapses. Israel as a result invaded into the buffer zone between Syria and the Israeli-occupied Golan Heights.
- 2025 – Singapore, under the government's approval, published its now-declassified Albatross file, comprising information relating to the Proclamation of Singapore dating back six decades ago.

== Births ==
=== Pre-1600 ===
- 65 BC – Horace, Roman poet (died 8 BC)
- 1021 – Wang Anshi, Chinese economist and chancellor (died 1086)
- 1412 – Astorre II Manfredi, Italian lord (died 1468)
- 1418 – Queen Jeonghui, Queen consort of Korea (died 1483)
- 1424 – Anselm Adornes, Belgian merchant, politician and diplomat (died 1483)
- 1538 – Miklós Istvánffy, Hungarian politician (died 1615)
- 1542 – Mary, Queen of Scots, daughter of James V of Scotland and Mary of Guise (died 1587)
- 1558 – François de La Rochefoucauld, Catholic cardinal (died 1645)

=== 1601–1900 ===
- 1678 – Antonio de Benavides, colonial governor of Florida (died 1762)
- 1678 – Horatio Walpole, 1st Baron Walpole, English politician and diplomat, British Ambassador to France (died 1757)
- 1699 – Maria Josepha of Austria, Queen Consort of Poland (died 1757)
- 1708 – Francis I, Holy Roman Emperor (died 1765)
- 1724 – Claude Balbastre, French organist and composer (died 1799)
- 1730 – Jan Ingenhousz, Dutch physician, physiologist, and botanist (died 1799)
- 1731 – František Xaver Dušek, Czech pianist and composer (died 1799)
- 1756 – Archduke Maximilian Francis of Austria (died 1801)
- 1765 – Eli Whitney, American engineer, invented the cotton gin (died 1825)
- 1795 – Peter Andreas Hansen, Danish astronomer and mathematician (died 1874)
- 1807 – Friedrich Traugott Kützing, German pharmacist, botanist and phycologist (died 1893)
- 1813 – August Belmont, Prussian-American financier and diplomat, 16th United States Ambassador to the Netherlands (died 1890)
- 1815 – Adolph Menzel, German painter and illustrator (died 1905)
- 1817 – Christian Emil Krag-Juel-Vind-Frijs, Danish lawyer and politician, 10th Prime Minister of Denmark (died 1896)
- 1818 – Charles III, Prince of Monaco (died 1889)
- 1822 – Jakov Ignjatović, Hungarian-Serbian author (died 1889)
- 1832 – Bjørnstjerne Bjørnson, Norwegian-French author and playwright, Nobel Prize laureate (died 1910)
- 1860 – Amanda McKittrick Ros, Irish author and poet (died 1939)
- 1861 – William C. Durant, American businessman, founded General Motors and Chevrolet (died 1947)
- 1861 – Aristide Maillol, French sculptor and painter (died 1944)
- 1861 – Georges Méliès, French actor, director, producer, and screenwriter (died 1938)
- 1862 – Georges Feydeau, French playwright (died 1921)
- 1863 – Charles Lincoln Edwards, American zoologist (died 1937)
- 1864 – Camille Claudel, French illustrator and sculptor (died 1943)
- 1864 – Aleksander Meysztowicz, Polish politician and landowner (died 1943)
- 1865 – Rüdiger von der Goltz, German general (died 1946)
- 1865 – Jacques Hadamard, French mathematician and academic (died 1963)
- 1865 – Jean Sibelius, Finnish violinist and composer (died 1957)
- 1874 – Ernst Moro, Austrian physician and pediatrician (died 1951)
- 1875 – Frederik Buch, Danish actor and screenwriter (died 1925)
- 1877 – Paul Ladmirault, French pianist, violinist, and composer (died 1944)
- 1880 – Johannes Aavik, Estonian linguist and philologist (died 1973)
- 1881 – Tuomas Bryggari, Finnish politician (died 1964)
- 1881 – Albert Gleizes, French painter (died 1953)
- 1884 – Francis Balfour, English colonel and politician (died 1965)
- 1886 – Diego Rivera, Mexican painter and educator (died 1957)
- 1887 – Elizabeth Daryush, English poet (died 1977)
- 1890 – Bohuslav Martinů, Czech-American pianist and composer (died 1959)
- 1892 – Marcus Lee Hansen, American historian, author, and academic (died 1938)
- 1894 – E. C. Segar, American cartoonist, created Popeye (died 1938)
- 1894 – James Thurber, American humorist and cartoonist (died 1961)
- 1899 – Arthur Leslie, English-Welsh actor and playwright (died 1970)
- 1899 – John Qualen, Canadian-American actor (died 1987)
- 1900 – Sun Li-jen, Chinese general and politician (died 1990)
- 1900 – Ants Oras, Estonian-American author and academic (died 1982)

=== 1901–present ===
- 1902 – Wifredo Lam, Cuban-French painter (died 1982)
- 1903 – Zelma Watson George, Black American opera singer (died 1994)
- 1908 – Concha Piquer, Spanish singer and actress (died 1990)
- 1908 – John A. Volpe, American soldier and politician, 61st Governor of Massachusetts (died 1994)
- 1911 – Lee J. Cobb, American actor (died 1976)
- 1911 – Nikos Gatsos, Greek poet and songwriter (died 1992)
- 1913 – Delmore Schwartz, American poet and short story writer (died 1966)
- 1914 – Floyd Tillman, American country music singer-songwriter and guitarist (died 2003)
- 1914 – Ernie Toshack, Australian cricketer (died 2003)
- 1915 – Ernest Lehman, American director, producer, and screenwriter (died 2005)
- 1916 – Richard Fleischer, American director, producer, and screenwriter (died 2006)
- 1917 – Ian Johnson, Australian cricketer and administrator (died 1998)
- 1919 – Peter Tali Coleman, Samoan-American lawyer and politician, 43rd Governor of American Samoa (died 1997)
- 1919 – Julia Bowman Robinson, American mathematician and theorist (died 1985)
- 1919 – Kateryna Yushchenko, Ukrainian computer scientist and academic (died 2001)
- 1920 – McDonald Bailey, Trinidadian-English sprinter and rugby player (died 2013)
- 1922 – Lucian Freud, German-English painter and illustrator (died 2011)
- 1922 – Jean Ritchie, American singer-songwriter (died 2015)
- 1923 – Dewey Martin, American actor (died 2018)
- 1923 – Rudolph Pariser, Chinese-American soldier and chemist (died 2021)
- 1924 – Lionel Gilbert, Australian historian, author, and academic (died 2015)
- 1925 – Sammy Davis Jr., American actor, singer, and dancer (died 1990)
- 1925 – Nasir Kazmi, Pakistani Urdu poet (died 1972)
- 1925 – Carmen Martín Gaite, Spanish author and poet (died 2000)
- 1925 – Jimmy Smith, American organist (died 2005)
- 1926 – Ralph Puckett, American Army officer (died 2024)
- 1927 – Niklas Luhmann, German thinker and social theorist (died 1998)
- 1927 – Vladimir Shatalov, Kazakhstani general, pilot, and astronaut (died 2021)
- 1928 – Bill Hewitt, Canadian journalist and sportscaster (died 1996)
- 1928 – Ulric Neisser, German-American psychologist, neuroscientist, and academic (died 2012)
- 1929 – Victor Nosach, chronicler of the history of workers and trade union of Russia (died 2011)
- 1930 – Julian Critchley, English journalist and politician (died 2000)
- 1930 – Maximilian Schell, Austrian-Swiss actor, director, producer, and screenwriter (died 2014)
- 1931 – Bob Arum, American boxing promoter, founded Top Rank
- 1932 – Claus Luthe, German automotive designer (died 2008)
- 1933 – Johnny Green, American basketball player (died 2023)
- 1933 – Flip Wilson, American actor and comedian (died 1998)
- 1935 – Dharmendra, Indian actor, producer, and politician (died 2025)
- 1935 – Tatiana Zatulovskaya, Russian-Israeli chess player (died 2017)
- 1936 – David Carradine, American actor, director, and producer (died 2009)
- 1936 – Michael Hobson, American publisher (died 2020)
- 1936 – Peter Parfitt, English cricketer
- 1936 – Juan Ricardo Faccio, Uruguayan football player and manager (died 2024)
- 1937 – James MacArthur, American actor (died 2010)
- 1937 – Arne Næss Jr., German-Norwegian mountaineer and businessman (died 2004)
- 1939 – Red Berenson, Canadian ice hockey player and coach
- 1939 – Jerry Butler, American singer-songwriter and producer (died 2025)
- 1939 – James Galway, Irish flute player
- 1939 – Felipe Gozon, Filipino lawyer and businessman
- 1939 – Dariush Mehrjui, Iranian director, producer, and screenwriter (died 2023)
- 1939 – Soko Richardson, American drummer (died 2004)
- 1940 – Brant Alyea, American baseball player (died 2024)
- 1941 – Ed Brinkman, American baseball player and coach (died 2008)
- 1941 – Bob Brown, American football player (died 2023)
- 1941 – Duke Cunningham, American commander and politician (died 2025)
- 1941 – Bobby Elliott, English drummer
- 1941 – Geoff Hurst, English footballer and manager
- 1942 – Bob Love, American basketball player (died 2024)
- 1943 – Larry Martin, American paleontologist and ornithologist (died 2013)
- 1943 – Jim Morrison, American singer-songwriter and poet (died 1971)
- 1943 – James Tate, American poet (died 2015)
- 1943 – Bodo Tümmler, German runner
- 1943 – Mary Woronov, American actress, director, and screenwriter
- 1944 – George Baker, Dutch singer-songwriter
- 1944 – Bertie Higgins, American singer-songwriter
- 1944 – Ted Irvine, Canadian ice hockey player
- 1944 – Vince MacLean, Canadian educator and politician
- 1945 – John Banville, Irish novelist and screenwriter
- 1945 – Julie Heldman, American tennis player
- 1946 – Chava Alberstein, Polish-Israeli singer-songwriter and guitarist
- 1946 – John Rubinstein, American actor, director, and composer
- 1947 – Gregg Allman, American musician (died 2017)
- 1947 – Gérard Blanc, French singer, guitarist, and actor (died 2009)
- 1947 – Thomas Cech, American chemist and academic, Nobel Prize laureate
- 1947 – Kati-Claudia Fofonoff, Finnish author and poet (died 2011)
- 1947 – Margaret Geller, American astrophysicist, astronomer, and academic
- 1948 – Luis Caffarelli, Argentinian-American mathematician and academic
- 1948 – John Waters, English-Australian actor, singer-songwriter, and guitarist
- 1949 – Mary Gordon, American author, critic, and academic
- 1949 – Nancy Meyers, American director, producer, and screenwriter
- 1949 – Robert Sternberg, American psychologist and academic
- 1950 – Rick Baker, American actor and makeup artist
- 1950 – Tim Foli, American baseball player, coach, and manager
- 1950 – Dan Hartman, American singer-songwriter and producer (died 1994)
- 1951 – Bill Bryson, American essayist, travel and science writer
- 1951 – Richard Desmond, English publisher and businessman, founded Northern & Shell
- 1951 – Jan Eggum, Norwegian singer-songwriter and guitarist
- 1952 – Steve Atkinson, English-Hong Kong cricketer
- 1952 – Khaw Boon Wan, Malayan-Singaporean politician, Singaporean Minister of Health
- 1953 – Kim Basinger, American actress
- 1953 – Norman Finkelstein, American author, academic, and activist
- 1953 – Roy Firestone, American sportscaster and journalist
- 1953 – Sam Kinison, American comedian (died 1992)
- 1953 – Władysław Kozakiewicz, Lithuanian-Polish pole vaulter and coach
- 1953 – Steve Yates, English footballer
- 1954 – Harold Hongju Koh, American lawyer, academic, and politician
- 1954 – Frits Pirard, Dutch cyclist
- 1955 – Milenko Zablaćanski, Serbian actor, director, and screenwriter (died 2008)
- 1956 – Warren Cuccurullo, American singer-songwriter and guitarist
- 1956 – Andrius Kubilius, Lithuanian academic and politician, 9th Prime Minister of Lithuania
- 1956 – Slick, American wrestler and manager
- 1957 – Mike Buchanan, British men's rights advocate
- 1957 – James Cama, American martial artist and educator (died 2014)
- 1957 – Phil Collen, English singer-songwriter and guitarist
- 1958 – Rob Byrnes, American author and blogger
- 1958 – Rob Curling, Malayan-English journalist
- 1958 – Arlette Sombo-Dibélé, Central African lawyer and politician
- 1958 – Michel Ferté, French race car driver (died 2023)
- 1958 – Bob Greene, American physiologist and author
- 1958 – Mirosław Okoński, Polish footballer
- 1958 – George Rogers, American football player
- 1959 – Stephen Jefferies, South African cricketer and coach
- 1959 – Mark Steyn, Canadian-American author and critic
- 1960 – Aaron Allston, American game designer and author (died 2014)
- 1960 – Lim Guan Eng, Malaysian accountant and politician
- 1961 – Mark Bugden, Australian rugby league player
- 1961 – Ann Coulter, American political commentator and author
- 1961 – Conceição Lima, São Toméan poet
- 1961 – Mikey Robins, Australian comedian and television host
- 1962 – Steve Elkington, Australian-American golfer
- 1962 – Marty Friedman, American-Japanese guitarist, songwriter, and television host
- 1962 – Nikos Karageorgiou, Greek footballer and manager
- 1962 – Berry van Aerle, Dutch footballer
- 1963 – Greg Howe, American guitarist, songwriter, and producer
- 1963 – Toshiaki Kawada, Japanese wrestler
- 1963 – Wendell Pierce, American actor
- 1963 – Ricky Walford, Australian rugby league player
- 1964 – James Blundell, Australian singer-songwriter and guitarist
- 1964 – Teri Hatcher, American actress
- 1964 – Chigusa Nagayo, Japanese wrestler
- 1964 – Óscar Ramírez, Costa Rican footballer and coach
- 1965 – David Harewood, English actor
- 1965 – Theo Maassen, Dutch actor, producer, and screenwriter
- 1965 – Teresa Weatherspoon, American basketball player and coach
- 1966 – Bushwick Bill, Jamaican-American rapper (died 2019)
- 1966 – Les Ferdinand, English footballer and coach
- 1966 – Matthew Labyorteaux, American actor
- 1966 – Tyler Mane, Canadian wrestler and actor
- 1966 – Sinéad O'Connor, Irish singer-songwriter (died 2023)
- 1967 – Jeff George, American football player
- 1967 – Andy Kapp, German curler
- 1967 – Kotono Mitsuishi, Japanese voice actress and singer
- 1967 – Darren Sheridan, English footballer and manager
- 1968 – Michael Cole, American sportscaster and journalist
- 1968 – Mike Mussina, American baseball player and coach
- 1968 – Doriano Romboni, Italian motorcycle racer (died 2013)
- 1969 – Kristin Lauter, American mathematician and cryptographer
- 1971 – Abdullah Ercan, Turkish footballer and manager
- 1972 – Indrek Allmann, Estonian architect
- 1972 – Janae Kroc, American powerlifter
- 1972 – Édson Ribeiro, Brazilian sprinter
- 1973 – Corey Taylor, American singer-songwriter, musician, and actor
- 1974 – Cristian Castro, Mexican singer
- 1974 – Nick Zinner, American guitarist, songwriter, and producer
- 1975 – Kevin Harvick, American race car driver
- 1976 – Brettina, Bahamian-American singer-songwriter and actress
- 1976 – Reed Johnson, American baseball player
- 1976 – Zoe Konstantopoulou, Greek lawyer and politician
- 1976 – Dominic Monaghan, German-British actor
- 1977 – Ryan Newman, American race car driver
- 1977 – Aleksandra Olsza, Polish tennis player
- 1977 – Anita Weyermann, Swiss runner and journalist
- 1978 – John Oster, English-Welsh footballer
- 1978 – Frédéric Piquionne, French footballer
- 1978 – Anwar Siraj, Ethiopian footballer
- 1978 – Ian Somerhalder, American actor
- 1978 – Vernon Wells, American baseball player
- 1979 – Daniel Fitzhenry, Australian rugby player
- 1979 – Johan Forssell, Swedish lawyer and politician
- 1979 – Raymond Lam, Chinese actor and singer
- 1979 – Ingrid Michaelson, American singer-songwriter and pianist
- 1979 – Christian Wilhelmsson, Swedish footballer
- 1980 – Yuliya Krevsun, Ukrainian runner
- 1980 – Brandt Snedeker, American golfer
- 1981 – Philip Rivers, American football player
- 1982 – Alfredo Aceves, Mexican baseball player
- 1982 – Halil Altıntop, Turkish footballer
- 1982 – Hamit Altıntop, Turkish footballer
- 1982 – Chrisette Michele, American singer-songwriter
- 1982 – Nicki Minaj, Trinidadian-American rapper and actress
- 1982 – Serena Ryder, Canadian singer-songwriter
- 1983 – Neel Jani, Swiss race car driver
- 1984 – Emma Green Tregaro, Swedish high jumper
- 1984 – Greg Halford, English footballer
- 1984 – Sam Hunt, American singer-songwriter
- 1985 – Josh Donaldson, American baseball player
- 1985 – Meagan Duhamel, Canadian figure skater
- 1985 – Dwight Howard, American basketball player
- 1985 – Oleksiy Pecherov, Ukrainian basketball player
- 1986 – Enzo Amore, American wrestler and rapper
- 1986 – Amir Khan, English boxer
- 1986 – Sam Tagataese, New Zealand-Samoan rugby league player
- 1986 – Kate Voegele, American singer-songwriter, guitarist, and actress
- 1989 – Drew Doughty, Canadian ice hockey player
- 1989 – Jen Ledger, English musician and singer
- 1989 – Andrew Nicholson, Canadian basketball player
- 1989 – Jesse Sene-Lefao, New Zealand rugby league player
- 1991 – Philip Holm, Swedish ice hockey player
- 1992 – Mattias Janmark, Swedish ice hockey player
- 1992 – Yui Yokoyama, Japanese idol, model, and actress
- 1993 – Janari Jõesaar, Estonian basketball player
- 1993 – Cara Mund, American model, Miss America 2018
- 1993 – Jordan Obita, English footballer
- 1993 – AnnaSophia Robb, American actress
- 1994 – Cyriel Dessers, Belgian-Nigerian footballer
- 1994 – Conseslus Kipruto, Kenyan runner
- 1994 – Raheem Sterling, English footballer
- 1995 – Thatcher Demko, American ice hockey player
- 1996 – Scott McTominay, Scottish footballer
- 1997 – Hakeem Adeniji, American football player
- 1997 – Sam Hauser, American basketball player
- 1998 – Josh Dunne, American ice hockey player
- 1998 – Owen Teague, American actor
- 1999 – Reece James, English footballer
- 1999 – Tyrus Wheat, American football player
- 2000 – DeMario Douglas, American football player
- 2000 – Bayron Matos, Dominican American football player
- 2000 – Andy Pages, Cuban baseball player
- 2001 – Josh Christopher, American basketball player
- 2002 – Sunghoon, South Korean singer
- 2004 – Billie Starkz, American professional wrestler
- 2004 – Momoe Mori, Japanese entertainer

== Deaths ==
=== Pre-1600 ===
- 855 – Drogo of Metz, illegitimate son of Charlemagne (born 801)
- 899 – Arnulf of Carinthia (born 850)
- 964 – Zhou the Elder, Chinese queen consort
- 1186 – Berthold IV, Duke of Zähringen (bornc 1125)
- 1292 – John Peckham, Archbishop of Canterbury
- 1365 – Nicholas II, Duke of Opava (born 1288)
- 1431 – Hedwig Jagiellon, Polish and Lithuanian princess (born 1408)
- 1550 – Gian Giorgio Trissino, Italian humanist, poet, dramatist and diplomat (born 1478)
- 1596 – Luis de Carvajal the Younger, Marrano writer and martyr (born c. 1566/1567)

=== 1601–1900 ===
- 1626 – John Davies, English poet, lawyer, and politician (born 1569)
- 1632 – Philippe van Lansberge, Dutch astronomer and mathematician (born 1561)
- 1638 – Ivan Gundulić, Croatian poet (born 1589)
- 1643 – John Pym, English politician (born 1583)
- 1649 – Noël Chabanel, French missionary and saint (born 1613)
- 1680 – Henry Pierrepont, 1st Marquess of Dorchester, English lawyer and politician (born 1606)
- 1691 – Richard Baxter, English minister, poet, and hymn-writer (born 1615)
- 1695 – Barthélemy d'Herbelot, French orientalist and academic (born 1625)
- 1709 – Thomas Corneille, French playwright and philologist (born 1625)
- 1722 – Elizabeth Charlotte, Princess Palatine (born 1652)
- 1734 – James Figg, English prizefighter
- 1744 – Marie Anne de Mailly, French mistress of Louis XV (born 1717)
- 1745 – Étienne Fourmont, French orientalist and academic (born 1683)
- 1746 – Charles Radclyffe, English courtier and soldier (born 1693)
- 1756 – William Stanhope, 1st Earl of Harrington, English politician and diplomat, Lord Lieutenant of Ireland (born 1690)
- 1768 – Jean Denis Attiret, French painter and missionary (born 1702)
- 1779 – Nathan Alcock, English physician (born 1707)
- 1815 – Mary Bosanquet Fletcher, Methodist preacher and philanthropist (born 1739)
- 1830 – Benjamin Constant, Swiss-French philosopher and author (born 1767)
- 1856 – Theobald Mathew, Irish social reformer and temperance movement leader (born 1790)
- 1859 – Thomas De Quincey, English journalist and author (born 1785)
- 1864 – George Boole, English mathematician and philosopher (born 1815)
- 1869 – Narcisa de Jesús, Ecuadorian saint (born 1832)
- 1885 – William Henry Vanderbilt, American businessman and philanthropist (born 1821)
- 1886 – Isaac Lea, American conchologist, geologist, and publisher (born 1792)
- 1894 – Pafnuty Chebyshev, Russian mathematician and theorist (born 1821)

=== 1901–present ===
- 1903 – Herbert Spencer, English biologist, anthropologist, sociologist, and philosopher (born 1820)
- 1907 – King Oscar II of Sweden (born 1829)
- 1913 – Camille Jenatzy, Belgian race car driver (born 1868)
- 1914 – Melchior Anderegg, Swiss mountain guide (born 1828)
- 1914 – Maximilian von Spee, Danish-German admiral (born 1861)
- 1917 – Mendele Mocher Sforim, Russian author (born 1836)
- 1918 – Josip Stadler, Bosnian Catholic archbishop (born 1843)
- 1919 – J. Alden Weir, American painter (born 1852)
- 1922 – Dick Barrett, executed Irish Republican Army leader (born 1889)
- 1922 - Joe McKelvey, executed Irish Republican Army leader (born 1898)
- 1922 - LIam Mellows, executed Irish Republican Army leader (born 1892)
- 1922 - Rory O'Connor, executed Irish Republican Army leader, (born 1883)
- 1929 – José Vicente Concha, Colombian politician and 8th President of Colombia (born 1867)
- 1932 – Gertrude Jekyll, British horticulturist and writer (born 1843)
- 1937 – Hans Molisch, Czech-Austrian botanist and academic (born 1856)
- 1938 – Friedrich Glauser, Swiss author (born 1896)
- 1940 – George Lloyd, English-Canadian bishop and theologian (born 1861)
- 1941 – Izidor Kürschner, Hungarian football player and coach (born 1885)
- 1942 – Albert Kahn, American architect, Fisher Building, Packard Automotive Plant, Ford River Rouge Complex (born 1869)
- 1946 – Tex O'Reilly, American mercenary (born 1880)
- 1952 – Charles Lightoller, English sailor (born 1874)
- 1954 – Claude Cahun, French artist, photographer, and writer (born 1894)
- 1954 – Gladys George, American actress (born 1904)
- 1954 – Joseph B. Keenan, American lawyer and politician (born 1888)
- 1958 – Tris Speaker, American baseball player and manager (born 1888)
- 1963 – Sarit Thanarat, Thai field marshal and politician, 11th Prime Minister of Thailand (born 1908)
- 1966 – Ward Morehouse, American playwright, author, and critic (born 1899)
- 1970 – Cahir Healy, Irish Anti-Partitionist politician (born 1877)
- 1971 – Ernst Krenkel, Russian geographer and explorer (born 1903)
- 1971 – Eleni Ourani, Greek poet and critic (born 1896)
- 1975 – Gary Thain, New Zealand bass player (born 1948)
- 1978 – Golda Meir, Ukrainian-Israeli educator and politician, 4th Prime Minister of Israel (born 1898)
- 1980 – John Lennon, English singer-songwriter and guitarist (born 1940)
- 1982 – Bram Behr, Surinamese journalist and politician (born 1951)
- 1982 – André Kamperveen, Surinamese footballer and manager (born 1924)
- 1982 – Marty Robbins, American singer-songwriter and race car driver (born 1925)
- 1982 – Haim Laskov, Israel Defense Forces fifth Chief of Staff (born 1919)
- 1983 – Keith Holyoake, New Zealand farmer and politician, 26th Prime Minister of New Zealand (born 1904)
- 1983 – Slim Pickens, American actor (born 1919)
- 1984 – Luther Adler, American actor (born 1903)
- 1984 – Robert Jay Mathews, American militant leader, founded The Order (born 1953)
- 1984 – Razzle, English drummer (born 1960)
- 1984 – Semih Sancar, Turkish general (born 1911)
- 1991 – Buck Clayton, American trumpet player and composer (born 1911)
- 1992 – William Shawn, American journalist (born 1917)
- 1993 – Yevgeny Minayev, Russian weightlifter (born 1933)
- 1994 – Antônio Carlos Jobim, Brazilian singer-songwriter and pianist (born 1927)
- 1996 – Howard Rollins, American actor (born 1950)
- 1996 – Kashiwado Tsuyoshi, Japanese sumo wrestler, the 47th Yokozuna (born 1938)
- 1997 – Bob Bell, American clown and actor (born 1922)
- 1999 – Péter Kuczka, Hungarian poet and author (born 1923)
- 2001 – Mirza Delibašić, Bosnian basketball player and coach (born 1954)
- 2001 – Betty Holberton, American computer scientist and programmer (born 1917)
- 2003 – Rubén González, Cuban pianist (born 1919)
- 2003 – Pekka Siitoin, Finnish neo-Nazi and Satanist (b. 1944)
- 2004 – Dimebag Darrell, American singer-songwriter and guitarist (born 1966)
- 2005 – Rose Heilbron, British barrister and judge (born 1914)
- 2006 – Martha Tilton, American singer (born 1915)
- 2006 – José Uribe, Dominican baseball player (born 1959)
- 2007 – Gerardo García Pimentel, Mexican journalist (born 1983)
- 2008 – Oliver Postgate, English voice actor, director, producer, and screenwriter (born 1925)
- 2008 – Robert Prosky, American actor (born 1930)
- 2009 – Luis Días, Dominican singer-songwriter and guitarist (born 1952)
- 2012 – Jerry Brown, American football player (born 1987)
- 2012 – John Gowans, Scottish-English 16th General of The Salvation Army (born 1934)
- 2012 – Johnny Lira, American boxer (born 1951)
- 2013 – John Cornforth, Australian-English chemist and academic, Nobel Prize laureate (born 1917)
- 2013 – Sándor Szokolay, Hungarian composer and academic (born 1931)
- 2013 – Richard S. Williamson, American lawyer and diplomat (born 1949)
- 2014 – Tom Gosnell, Canadian lawyer and politician (born 1951)
- 2014 – Russ Kemmerer, American baseball player and coach (born 1930)
- 2014 – Knut Nystedt, Norwegian organist and composer (born 1915)
- 2015 – Mattiwilda Dobbs, American soprano and actress (born 1925)
- 2015 – Alan Hodgkinson, English footballer and coach (born 1936)
- 2015 – Douglas Tompkins, American businessman, co-founded The North Face and Esprit Holdings (born 1943)
- 2015 – John Trudell, American author, poet, and actor (born 1946)
- 2015 – Elsie Tu, English-Hong Kong educator and politician (born 1913)
- 2016 – John Glenn, American astronaut and senator, first American to go into orbit (born 1921)
- 2018 – David Weatherall, English physician, geneticist, and academic (born 1933)
- 2019 – René Auberjonois, American actor (born 1940)
- 2019 – Juice Wrld, American rapper, singer and songwriter (born 1998)
- 2019 – Caroll Spinney, American puppeteer and actor (born 1933)
- 2021 – Robbie Shakespeare, Jamaican bass guitarist and record producer (born 1953)
- 2023 – Ryan O'Neal, American actor (born 1941)
- 2024 – Jill Jacobson, American actress (born 1954)
- 2024 – Clarke Reed, American businessman and politician (born 1928)

== Holidays and observances ==
- Battle Day (Falkland Islands)
- Bodhi Day (Japan)
- CARICOM–Cuba Day (Caribbean Community (CARICOM) and Cuba)
- Christian feast day:
  - Budoc (Beuzec) of Dol
  - Clement of Ohrid (Julian Calendar), and its related observances:
    - Student's Day (Bulgaria)
  - Eucharius
  - Feast of the Immaculate Conception (public holiday in several countries, a holy day of obligation in others), and its related observances:
    - Conception of the Blessed Virgin Mary (Anglican Communion), lesser commemoration
    - Festa da Conceição da Praia, celebrating Yemanjá, Queen of the Ocean in Umbanda (Salvador, Bahia)
    - Festival of Lights (Lyon)
    - Mother's Day (Panama)
    - Lady of Camarin Day (Guam)
  - Patapios of Thebes
  - Pope Eutychian
  - Richard Baxter (US Episcopal Church)
  - Romaric
  - Theobald of Marly
  - December 8 (Eastern Orthodox liturgics)
- Constitution Day (Romania)
- Constitution Day (Uzbekistan)
- Liberation Day (Syria)
- Day of Finnish Music (Finland)
- Earliest day on which National Tree Planting Day can fall, while December 14 is the latest; celebrated on the second Monday in December. (Malawi)
- Hari-Kuyō (Kansai region, Japan)
- National Youth Day (Albania)
- Nations, Nationalities and Peoples' Day (Ethiopia)
