= May 7 =

May 7 this year in various calendars
- Thursday, 7 May 2026
Akan	Nkyiyaw
Armenian	21 Mareri 1475
Aztec	Xocotlhuetzi 17, 1 Cōātl
Babylonian	19 Nisanu, 2337 SE
Balinese pawukon	Menga, Kajeng, Sri, Wage, Urukung, Wraspati of Taulu, Sri, Gigis, Suka
Bengali	24 Boisakh, BS 1433
Chinese	Yin Metal Snake・Dipper Mansion; Fire Horse Year, Month 3, Day 21 (Lixia, 14 days until Xiaoman)
Common Era	7 May 2026 CE
Coptic	29 Parmouti, AM 1742
Egyptian	21 Thoth, 2775 NE
Ethiopian	29 Miyāzyā, 2018 Amätä Məhrät
French Republican	Décade II, Octidi de Floréal de l'Année 234 de la République
Gregorian	7 May, AD 2026
Hebrew	20 Iyar, AM 5786; Omer 35
Hindu	Pūrvāṣāḍha・Sādhya; Solar: 24 Vaiśākha, 1948 SE; Lunisolar: Adhika Pañcamī, Kṛishna pakṣa of Vaiśākha, 2083 VE; Rāudra・5127 KY・1,872,702
Icelandic	Fimmtudagur, 15 Harpa 2026
Islamic	20 Dhu al-Qi'dah, AH 1447 (using tabular method)
ISO week date	2026-W19-4
Japanese	21 Yayoi, Reiwa 8 (Rikka, 14 days until Shōman)
Julian	24 April, AD 2026 (AM 7534)
Julian day	2461168
Korean	21 Yongdal, 4359 DE
Maya	13.0.13.10.5; 18 Uo, 1 Chicchan
Roman	ante diem VIII Kalendas Maias, MMDCCLXXIX AUC
Solar Hijri	17 Ordibehesht, SH 1405
Tibetan	21 nag pa, me pho rta 2153 or 1772 or 1000

<<	May					>>
Su	Mo	Tu	We	Th	Fr	Sa
					1	2
3	4	5	6	7	8	9
10	11	12	13	14	15	16
17	18	19	20	21	22	23
24	25	26	27	28	29	30
31
2026

May 7 in recent years
2026 (Thursday)
2025 (Wednesday)
2024 (Tuesday)
2023 (Sunday)
2022 (Saturday)
2021 (Friday)
2020 (Thursday)
2019 (Tuesday)
2018 (Monday)
2017 (Sunday)

May 7 is the 127th day of the year (128th in leap years) in the Gregorian calendar; 238 days remain until the end of the year.

== Events ==
=== Pre-1600 ===
- 351 – The Jewish revolt against Constantius Gallus breaks out after his arrival at Antioch.
- 558 – In Constantinople, the dome of the Hagia Sophia collapses, twenty years after its construction. Justinian I immediately orders that the dome be rebuilt.
- 1104 – The Seljuk emirs of Mosul and Mardin defeat the Crusader States of Antioch and Edessa.
- 1190 – The Crusader army of emperor Frederick Barbarossa defeats an army of the Rum Seljuks in the battle of Philomelion.
- 1274 – In France, the Second Council of Lyon opens; it ratified a decree to regulate the election of the Pope.
- 1342 – In Avignon, France, Cardinal Pierre Roger is elected Pope and takes the name Clement VI.
- 1487 – The Siege of Málaga commences during the Spanish Reconquista.
- 1544 – The Burning of Edinburgh by an English army is the first action of the Rough Wooing.

=== 1601–1900 ===
- 1625 – State funeral of James VI and I (1566–1625) is held at Westminster Abbey.
- 1664 – Inaugural celebrations begin at Louis XIV's new Palace of Versailles.
- 1685 – Battle of Vrtijeljka between rebels and Ottoman forces.
- 1697 – Stockholm's medieval castle Tre Kronor is destroyed by fire. It is replaced in the 18th century by the current Royal Palace.
- 1718 – The city of New Orleans is founded by Jean-Baptiste Le Moyne, Sieur de Bienville.
- 1763 – Pontiac's War begins with Pontiac's attempt to seize Fort Detroit from the British.
- 1765 – HMS Victory is launched at Chatham Dockyard, Kent. She is not commissioned until 1778.
- 1775 – The Ottoman Empire cedes Bukovina to the Habsburg monarchy.
- 1794 – French Revolution: Robespierre introduces the Cult of the Supreme Being in the National Convention as the new state religion of the French First Republic.
- 1798 – French Revolutionary Wars: A French force attempting to dislodge a small British garrison on the Îles Saint-Marcouf is repulsed with heavy losses.
- 1824 – World premiere of Ludwig van Beethoven's Ninth Symphony in Vienna, Austria. The performance is conducted by Michael Umlauf under the composer's supervision.
- 1832 – Greece's independence is recognized by the Treaty of London.
- 1840 – The Great Natchez Tornado strikes Natchez, Mississippi killing 317 people. It is the second deadliest tornado in United States history.
- 1864 – American Civil War: The Army of the Potomac, under General Ulysses S. Grant, breaks off from the Battle of the Wilderness and moves southwards.
- 1864 – The world's oldest surviving clipper ship, the City of Adelaide is launched by William Pile, Hay and Co. in Sunderland, England, for transporting passengers and goods between Britain and Australia.
- 1895 – In Saint Petersburg, Russian scientist Alexander Stepanovich Popov demonstrates to the Russian Physical and Chemical Society his invention, the Popov lightning detector—a primitive radio receiver. In some parts of the former Soviet Union the anniversary of this day is celebrated as Radio Day.

=== 1901–present ===
- 1915 – World War I: German submarine U-20 sinks RMS Lusitania, killing 1,199 people, including 128 Americans. Public reaction to the sinking turns many former pro-Germans in the United States against the German Empire.
- 1915 – The Republic of China accedes to 13 of the 21 Demands, extending the Empire of Japan's control over Manchuria and the Chinese economy.
- 1920 – Polish–Soviet War: Kyiv offensive: Polish troops led by Józef Piłsudski and Edward Rydz-Śmigły and assisted by a symbolic Ukrainian force capture Kyiv only to be driven out by the Red Army counter-offensive a month later.
- 1920 – Treaty of Moscow: Soviet Russia recognizes the independence of the Democratic Republic of Georgia only to invade the country six months later.
- 1930 – The 7.1 M_{w} Salmas earthquake shakes northwestern Iran and southeastern Turkey with a maximum Mercalli intensity of IX (Violent). Up to three-thousand people were killed.
- 1931 – The stand-off between criminal Francis Crowley and 300 members of the New York Police Department takes place in his fifth-floor apartment on West 91st Street, New York City.
- 1937 – Spanish Civil War: The German Condor Legion, equipped with Heinkel He 51 biplanes, arrives in Spain to assist Francisco Franco's forces.
- 1940 – World War II: The Norway Debate in the British House of Commons begins, and leads to the replacement of Prime Minister Neville Chamberlain with Winston Churchill three days later.
- 1942 – World War II: During the Battle of the Coral Sea, United States Navy aircraft carrier aircraft attack and sink the Imperial Japanese Navy light aircraft carrier Shōhō; the battle marks the first time in naval history that two enemy fleets fight without visual contact between warring ships.
- 1945 – World War II: Last German U-boat attack of the war, two freighters are sunk off the Firth of Forth, Scotland.
- 1946 – Tokyo Telecommunications Engineering (later renamed Sony) is founded.
- 1948 – The Council of Europe is founded during the Hague Congress.
- 1952 – The concept of the integrated circuit, the basis for all modern computers, is first published by Geoffrey Dummer.
- 1954 – Indochina War: The Battle of Dien Bien Phu ends in a French defeat and a Viet Minh victory (the battle began on March 13).
- 1960 – Cold War: U-2 Crisis of 1960: Soviet leader Nikita Khrushchev announces that his nation is holding American U-2 pilot Gary Powers.
- 1964 – Pacific Airlines Flight 773 is hijacked by Francisco Gonzales and crashes in Contra Costa County, California, killing 44.
- 1986 – Canadian Patrick Morrow becomes the first person to climb each of the Seven Summits.
- 1991 – A fire and explosion occurs at a fireworks factory at Sungai Buloh, Malaysia, killing 26.
- 1992 – Michigan ratifies a 203-year-old proposed amendment to the United States Constitution making the 27th Amendment law. This amendment bars the U.S. Congress from giving itself a mid-term pay raise.
- 1992 – Space Shuttle program: The Space Shuttle Endeavour is launched on its first mission, STS-49.
- 1992 – Three employees at a McDonald's Restaurant in Sydney, Nova Scotia, Canada, are brutally murdered and a fourth permanently disabled after a botched robbery. It is the first "fast-food murder" in Canada.
- 1994 – Edvard Munch's painting The Scream is recovered undamaged after being stolen from the National Gallery of Norway in February.
- 1998 – Mercedes-Benz buys Chrysler for US$40 billion and forms DaimlerChrysler in the largest industrial merger in history.
- 1999 – Pope John Paul II travels to Romania, becoming the first pope to visit a predominantly Eastern Orthodox country since the Great Schism in 1054.
- 1999 – Kosovo War: Three Chinese citizens are killed and 20 wounded when a NATO aircraft inadvertently bombs the Chinese embassy in Belgrade, Serbia.
- 1999 – In Guinea-Bissau, President João Bernardo Vieira is ousted in a military coup.
- 2000 – Vladimir Putin is inaugurated as president of Russia.
- 2002 – An EgyptAir Boeing 737-500 crashes on approach to Tunis–Carthage International Airport, killing 14 people.
- 2002 – A China Northern Airlines MD-82 plunges into the Yellow Sea, killing 112 people.
- 2004 – American businessman Nick Berg is beheaded by Islamist militants. The act is recorded on videotape and released on the Internet.
- 2023 – Tanur boat disaster: At least 22 people are killed when a boat carrying tourists capsizes in Tanur, Malappuram, Kerala, India.
- 2025 – The Indian Army and the Indian Air Force conduct surgical strikes code-named Operation SINDOOR on terrorist hideouts in Pakistan in response to the Pahalgam Attack that killed 26 people.

== Births ==
=== Pre-1600 ===
- Before 160 – Julia Maesa, Roman noblewoman (died 224)
- 1488 – John III of the Palatinate, archbishop of Regensburg (died 1538)
- 1530 – Louis, Prince of Condé (died 1569)
- 1553 – Albert Frederick, Duke of Prussia (died 1618)

=== 1601–1900 ===
- 1605 – Patriarch Nikon of Moscow (died 1681)
- 1643 – Stephanus Van Cortlandt, American politician, 10th Mayor of New York City (died 1700)
- 1700 – Gerard van Swieten, Dutch-Austrian physician (died 1772)
- 1701 – Carl Heinrich Graun, German tenor and composer (died 1759)
- 1711 – David Hume, Scottish economist, historian, and philosopher (died 1776)
- 1724 – Dagobert Sigmund von Wurmser, French-Austrian field marshal (died 1797)
- 1740 – Nikolai Arkharov, Russian police officer and general (died 1814)
- 1748 – Olympe de Gouges, French playwright and philosopher (died 1793)
- 1751 – Stephen Badlam, American artisan and military officer (died 1815)
- 1763 – Józef Poniatowski, Polish general (died 1813)
- 1767 – Princess Frederica Charlotte of Prussia (died 1820)
- 1774 – William Bainbridge, American commodore (died 1833)
- 1787 – Jacques Viger, Canadian archaeologist and politician, 1st mayor of Montreal (died 1858)
- 1812 – Robert Browning, English poet and playwright (died 1889)
- 1833 – Johannes Brahms, German pianist and composer (died 1897)
- 1836 – Joseph Gurney Cannon, American lawyer and politician, 40th Speaker of the United States House of Representatives (died 1926)
- 1837 – Karl Mauch, German geographer and explorer (died 1875)
- 1840 – Pyotr Ilyich Tchaikovsky, Russian composer and educator (died 1893)
- 1845 – Mary Eliza Mahoney, American nurse and activist (died 1926)
- 1847 – Archibald Primrose, 5th Earl of Rosebery, English politician, Prime Minister of the United Kingdom (died 1929)
- 1857 – William A. MacCorkle, American lawyer and politician, 9th Governor of West Virginia (died 1930)
- 1860 – Tom Norman, English businessman (died 1930)
- 1861 – Rabindranath Tagore, Indian author and poet, Nobel Prize laureate (died 1941)
- 1867 – Władysław Reymont, Polish novelist, Nobel Prize laureate (died 1925)
- 1875 – Bill Hoyt, American pole vaulter (died 1951)
- 1880 – Pandurang Vaman Kane, Indologist and Sanskrit scholar, Bharat Ratna awardee (died 1972)
- 1881 – George E. Wiley, American cyclist (died 1954)
- 1882 – Willem Elsschot, Belgian author and poet (died 1960)
- 1885 – George "Gabby" Hayes, American actor (died 1969)
- 1889 – Viktor Puskar, Estonian colonel (died 1943)
- 1891 – Harry McShane, Scottish engineer and activist (died 1988)
- 1892 – Archibald MacLeish, American poet, playwright, and lawyer (died 1982)
- 1892 – Josip Broz Tito, Yugoslav field marshal and politician, 1st President of Yugoslavia (died 1980)
- 1893 – Frank J. Selke, Canadian ice hockey coach and manager (died 1985)
- 1896 – Kathleen McKane Godfree, English tennis and badminton player (died 1992)
- 1899 – Alfred Gerrard, English sculptor and academic (died 1998)

=== 1901–present ===
- 1901 – Gary Cooper, American actor (died 1961)
- 1903 – Nikolay Zabolotsky, Russian-Soviet poet and translator (died 1958)
- 1905 – Philip Baxter, Welsh-Australian chemical engineer (died 1989)
- 1909 – Edwin H. Land, American scientist and inventor, co-founded the Polaroid Corporation (died 1991)
- 1909 – Dorothy Sunrise Lorentino, Native American teacher (died 2005)
- 1911 – Ishirō Honda, Japanese director, producer, and screenwriter (died 1993)
- 1913 – Simon Ramo, American physicist and engineer (died 2016)
- 1917 – Domenico Bartolucci, Italian cardinal and composer (died 2013)
- 1917 – Lenox Hewitt, Australian public servant (died 2020)
- 1917 – David Tomlinson, English actor (died 2000)
- 1919 – Eva Perón, Argentinian actress, 25th First Lady of Argentina (died 1952)
- 1920 – Rendra Karno, Indonesian actor (died 1985)
- 1922 – Darren McGavin, American actor and director (died 2006)
- 1923 – Anne Baxter, American actress (died 1985)
- 1927 – Ruth Prawer Jhabvala, German-American author and screenwriter (died 2013)
- 1929 – Dick Williams, American baseball player, coach, and manager (died 2011)
- 1930 – Babe Parilli, American football player and coach (died 2017)
- 1931 – Teresa Brewer, American singer (died 2007)
- 1931 – Gene Wolfe, American author (died 2019)
- 1932 – Pete Domenici, American lawyer and politician, 37th Mayor of Albuquerque (died 2017)
- 1932 – Derek Taylor, English journalist and author (died 1997)
- 1933 – Johnny Unitas, American football player and sportscaster (died 2002)
- 1935 – Michael Hopkins, English architect (died 2023)
- 1936 – Tony O'Reilly, Irish rugby player and businessman (died 2024)
- 1939 – Sidney Altman, Canadian-American biologist and academic, Nobel Prize laureate (died 2022)
- 1939 – Ruggero Deodato, Italian actor, director, and screenwriter (died 2022)
- 1939 – Ruud Lubbers, Dutch economist and politician, Prime Minister of the Netherlands (died 2018)
- 1939 – Johnny Maestro, American pop/doo-wop singer (died 2010)
- 1940 – Angela Carter, English novelist and short story writer (died 1992)
- 1943 – Terry Allen, American singer and painter
- 1943 – John Bannon, Australian academic and politician, 39th Premier of South Australia (died 2015)
- 1943 – Peter Carey, Australian novelist and short story writer
- 1945 – Christy Moore, Irish singer-songwriter and guitarist
- 1945 – Robin Strasser, American actress
- 1946 – Thelma Houston, American R&B/disco singer and actress
- 1946 – Marv Hubbard, American football player (died 2015)
- 1946 – Bill Kreutzmann, American drummer
- 1946 – Michael Rosen, English author and poet
- 1950 – John Dowling Coates, Australian lawyer, sports administrator and businessman
- 1950 – Randall "Tex" Cobb, American boxer and actor
- 1950 – Tim Russert, American television journalist and lawyer (died 2008)
- 1954 – Amy Heckerling, American director, producer, and screenwriter
- 1956 – Jan Peter Balkenende, Dutch jurist and politician, Prime Minister of the Netherlands
- 1956 – Anne Dudley, English pianist and composer
- 1956 – Nicholas Hytner, English director and producer
- 1956 – Jean Lapierre, Canadian talk show host and politician (died 2016)
- 1958 – Anne Marie Rafferty, English nurse and academic
- 1958 – William Ridenour, American politician
- 1960 – Ara Darzi, Baron Darzi of Denham, Iraqi-English surgeon and academic
- 1960 – Almudena Grandes, Spanish author (died 2021)
- 1961 – Sue Black, Scottish anthropologist and academic
- 1962 – Tony Campbell, American basketball player and coach
- 1964 – Ronnie Harmon, American football player
- 1964 – Leslie O'Neal, American football player
- 1965 – Reuben Davis, American football player
- 1965 – Owen Hart, Canadian wrestler (died 1999)
- 1965 – Norman Whiteside, Northern Irish footballer and manager
- 1967 – Roberto d'Amico, Belgian politician
- 1967 – Martin Bryant, Australian mass murderer
- 1967 – Joe Rice, American colonel and politician
- 1968 – Traci Lords, American actress and singer
- 1968 – Lisa Raitt, Canadian lawyer and politician, 30th Canadian Minister of Transport
- 1969 – Eagle-Eye Cherry, Swedish singer-songwriter
- 1971 – Dave Karpa, Canadian ice hockey player
- 1971 – Billy Moore, Australian rugby league player
- 1971 – Thomas Piketty, French economist
- 1972 – Frank Trigg, American mixed martial artist and wrestler
- 1974 – Breckin Meyer, American actor, writer, and producer
- 1975 – Martina Topley-Bird, English singer, songwriter, and multi-instrumentalist
- 1976 – Calvin Booth, American basketball player and executive
- 1976 – Stacey Jones, New Zealand rugby league player and coach
- 1976 – Michael P. Murphy, American lieutenant, Medal of Honor recipient (died 2005)
- 1976 – Ayelet Shaked, former Israeli Minister of Justice
- 1977 – Elton Flatley, Australian rugby player
- 1978 – Dette Escudero, Filipino politician
- 1978 – Shawn Marion, American basketball player
- 1979 – Katie Douglas, American basketball player
- 1984 – James Loney, American baseball player
- 1984 – Kevin Owens, Canadian wrestler
- 1984 – Alex Smith, American football player
- 1985 – J Balvin, Colombian singer-songwriter and producer
- 1986 – Matt Helders, English drummer
- 1987 – Aidy Bryant, American actress and comedian
- 1987 – Mark Reynolds, Scottish footballer
- 1989 – Earl Thomas, American football player
- 1990 – Sydney Leroux, Canadian-American footballer
- 1992 – Alexander Ludwig, Canadian actor and musician
- 1993 – Will Ospreay, English wrestler
- 1993 – Ajla Tomljanovic, Australian tennis player
- 1995 – Seko Fofana, Ivorian international footballer
- 1996 – Lee "Faker" Sang-hyeok, South Korean League of Legends pro gamer
- 1997 – Daria Kasatkina, Russian tennis player
- 1997 – Youri Tielemans, Belgian footballer
- 1997 – Cameron Young, American golfer
- 1998 – MrBeast, American YouTuber
- 1998 – Dani Olmo, Spanish footballer
- 1998 – Jesse Puljujärvi, Finnish ice hockey player
- 1999 – Tommy Fury, English boxer
- 1999 – Cody Gakpo, Dutch footballer
- 2002 – Jake Bongiovi, American model and actor
- 2002 – Andrew Barth Feldman, American actor and singer
- 2004 – Ashlyn Krueger, American tennis player
- 2004 – Minji, South Korean singer

== Deaths ==
=== Pre-1600 ===
- 721 – John of Beverley, bishop of York
- 833 – Ibn Hisham, Egyptian Muslim historian
- 973 – Otto I, Holy Roman Emperor (born 912)
- 1014 – Bagrat III, 1st King of Georgia (born 960)
- 1092 – Remigius de Fécamp, English monk and bishop
- 1166 – William I of Sicily
- 1202 – Hamelin de Warenne, Earl of Surrey
- 1205 – Ladislaus III of Hungary (born 1201)
- 1234 – Otto I, Duke of Merania (born c. 1180)
- 1243 – Hugh d'Aubigny, 5th Earl of Arundel
- 1427 – Thomas la Warr, 5th Baron De La Warr, English priest (born 1352)
- 1494 – Eskender, Emperor of Ethiopia (born 1471)
- 1523 – Franz von Sickingen, German knight (born 1481)
- 1539 – Ottaviano Petrucci, Italian printer (born 1466)

=== 1601–1900 ===
- 1617 – David Fabricius, German astronomer and theologian (born 1564)
- 1667 – Johann Jakob Froberger, German organist and composer (born 1616)
- 1682 – Feodor III of Russia (born 1661)
- 1685 – Bajo Pivljanin (born 1630)
- 1718 – Mary of Modena, Queen Consort of England, Scotland and Ireland (born 1658)
- 1793 – Pietro Nardini, Italian violinist and composer (born 1722)
- 1800 – Niccolò Piccinni, Italian composer (born 1728)
- 1805 – William Petty, 2nd Earl of Shelburne, Irish-English politician, Prime Minister of Great Britain (born 1737)
- 1815 – Jabez Bowen, American colonel and politician, 45th Deputy Governor of Rhode Island (born 1739)
- 1825 – Antonio Salieri, Italian composer and conductor (born 1750)
- 1840 – Caspar David Friedrich, German painter and educator (born 1774)
- 1868 – Henry Brougham, 1st Baron Brougham and Vaux, Scottish lawyer and politician, Lord High Chancellor of Great Britain (born 1778)
- 1872 – Alexander Loyd, American carpenter and politician, 4th Mayor of Chicago (born 1805)
- 1876 – William Buell Sprague, American clergyman, historian, and author (born 1795)
- 1880 – Luís Alves de Lima e Silva, Duke of Caxias, Brazilian general and statesman (born 1803)
- 1887 – C. F. W. Walther, German-American religious leader and theologian (born 1811)
- 1896 – H. H. Holmes, American serial killer (born 1861)

=== 1901–present ===
- 1902 – Agostino Roscelli, Italian priest and saint (born 1818)
- 1917 – Albert Ball, English fighter pilot (born 1896)
- 1919 – Eva Schiroky, Czech anarchist and cook (born 1840)
- 1922 – Max Wagenknecht, German pianist and composer (born 1857)
- 1924 – Alluri Sitarama Raju, Indian activist (born 1897/1898)
- 1925 – William Lever, 1st Viscount Leverhulme, English businessman and politician (born 1851)
- 1937 – Ernst A. Lehmann, German captain and author (born 1886)
- 1938 – Octavian Goga, Romanian politician, former Prime Minister (born 1881)
- 1940 – George Lansbury, English journalist and politician (born 1859)
- 1941 – James George Frazer, Scottish-English anthropologist and academic (born 1854)
- 1942 – Felix Weingartner, Croatian pianist, composer, and conductor (born 1863)
- 1943 – Fethi Okyar, Turkish colonel and politician, 2nd Prime Minister of Turkey (born 1880)
- 1946 – Herbert Macaulay, Nigerian journalist and politician (born 1864)
- 1951 – Warner Baxter, American actor (born 1889)
- 1967 – Margaret Larkin, American writer and poet (born 1899)
- 1958 – Mihkel Lüdig, Estonian organist, composer, and conductor (born 1880)
- 1976 – Alison Uttley, English children's book writer (born 1884)
- 1978 – Mort Weisinger, American journalist and author (born 1915)
- 1986 – Haldun Taner, Turkish playwright and author (born 1915)
- 1987 – Colin Blakely, Northern Irish actor (born 1930)
- 1987 – Paul Popham, American soldier and activist, co-founded Gay Men's Health Crisis (born 1941)
- 1990 – Sam Tambimuttu, Sri Lankan lawyer and politician (born 1932)
- 1994 – Clement Greenberg, American art critic (born 1909)
- 1995 – Ray McKinley, American drummer, singer, and bandleader (Glenn Miller Orchestra) (born 1910)
- 1998 – Allan McLeod Cormack, South African-English physicist and academic, Nobel Prize laureate (born 1924)
- 1998 – Eddie Rabbitt, American singer-songwriter and guitarist (born 1941)
- 2000 – Douglas Fairbanks, Jr., American captain, actor, and producer (born 1909)
- 2001 – Jacques de Bourbon-Busset, French author and politician (born 1912)
- 2004 – Waldemar Milewicz, Polish journalist (born 1956)
- 2005 – Tristan Egolf, American author and activist (born 1971)
- 2005 – Peter Rodino, American captain and politician (born 1909)
- 2005 – Otilino Tenorio, Ecuadorian footballer (born 1980)
- 2006 – Richard Carleton, Australian journalist (born 1943)
- 2006 – Joan C. Edwards, American singer and philanthropist (born 1918)
- 2007 – Isabella Blow, English magazine editor (born 1958)
- 2007 – Diego Corrales, American boxer (born 1977)
- 2007 – Octavian Paler, Romanian journalist and politician (born 1926)
- 2007 – Yahweh ben Yahweh, American cult leader, founded the Nation of Yahweh (born 1935)
- 2009 – David Mellor, English designer (born 1930)
- 2009 – Danny Ozark, American baseball player, coach, and manager (born 1923)
- 2010 – Adele Mara, American actress, singer and dancer (born 1923)
- 2010 – Wally Hickel, American politician, Governor of Alaska and Secretary of the Interior (born 1919)
- 2011 – Seve Ballesteros, Spanish golfer (born 1957)
- 2011 – Willard Boyle, Canadian physicist and academic, Nobel Prize laureate (born 1924)
- 2011 – Big George, English songwriter, producer, and radio host (born 1957)
- 2011 – Victor Nosach, Soviet historian (born 1929)
- 2012 – Sammy Barr, Scottish trade union leader (born 1931)
- 2012 – Ferenc Bartha, Hungarian economist and politician (born 1943)
- 2012 – Dennis E. Fitch, American captain and pilot (born 1942)
- 2013 – Ferruccio Mazzola, Italian footballer and manager (born 1948)
- 2013 – George Sauer, Jr., American football player (born 1943)
- 2014 – Neville McNamara, Australian air marshal (born 1923)
- 2014 – Colin Pillinger, English astronomer, chemist, and academic (born 1943)
- 2014 – Dick Welteroth, American baseball player (born 1927)
- 2015 – Frank DiPascali, American businessman (born 1956)
- 2015 – John Dixon, Australian-American author and illustrator (born 1929)
- 2023 – Aase Foss Abrahamsen, Norwegian writer (born 1930)
- 2024 – Steve Albini, American musician, record producer, audio engineer, and music journalist (born 1962)

== Holidays and observances ==
- Christian feast day:
  - Agathius of Byzantium
  - Agostino Roscelli
  - Anthony of Kiev
  - Pope Benedict II
  - Flavia Domitilla
  - Gisela of Hungary
  - Harriet Starr Cannon (Episcopal Church (USA))
  - John of Beverley
  - Rose Venerini
  - May 7 (Eastern Orthodox liturgics)
- Defender of the Fatherland Day (Kazakhstan)
- Dien Bien Phu Victory Day (Vietnam)
- Radio Day, commemorating the work of Alexander Popov (Russia, Bulgaria)
