= Zukhra Valeeva =

Russian master builder

- Зөһрә Вәлиева
- Born: Zukhra Sibgatovna Valeeva; 12 October 1947 (age 78); Turbasly, Iglinsky District, Bashkir ASSR, Russian SFSR
- Occupation: Master builder
- Years active: 1965–present
- Awards: Jubilee Medal "In Commemoration of the 100th Anniversary of the Birth of Vladimir Ilyich Lenin"; Medal "For Labour Valour"; Order of Labour Glory; Medal "Veteran of Labour"

Zukhra Sibgatovna Valeeva (Bashkir: Зөһрә Сибәғәт ҡыҙы Вәлиева; born 12 October 1947) is a Russian master builder who has been the foreperson of the painters of the Komsomol Youth Brigade since 1968. Under her guidance, the company has built five-story buildings, schools, kindergartens, the Sports Palace, a department store and entire neighbourhoods in the city of Ufa. Valeeva was an elected deputy of the Congress of People's Deputies of the Soviet Union from the Communist Party of the Soviet Union from 1989 to 1991. She has been awarded the Jubilee Medal "In Commemoration of the 100th Anniversary of the Birth of Vladimir Ilyich Lenin"; the Medal "For Labour Valour"; the Order of Labour Glory and the Medal "Veteran of Labour".

== Biography ==
Valeeva was born in the village of Turbasly, Iglinsky District, Bashkir Autonomous Soviet Socialist Republic on 12 October 1947. She moved to the small city of Ufa, and originally wanted to become a teacher. Valeeva graduated from the GPTU No. 17 in Ufa in 1965 and worked as a painter at the construction department No. 3 of the Ufa design and construction association for large-panel housing construction. As a student, she painted balconies and plastered walls at Prospekt Oktyabrya.

In 1968, Valeeva got a job as foreman of painters of the Komsomol Youth Brigade, focusing mostly on improving quality, painting technology and mastering large-panel housing construction. Valeeva's team built five-story buildings, neighbourhoods, schools, kindergartens, the Sports Palace, and Ufa's first department store. She did not seek promotion and remained the company's foreperson.

Valeeva was a member of the Communist Party of the Soviet Union, and was active in public life of the construction department. She was a member of the Bashkir Regional Committee of the Communist Party of the Soviet Union, and from 1989 to 1991, served as an elected deputy of the Congress of People's Deputies of the Soviet Union from the Communist Party of the Soviet Union. Valeeva was also a member of the Supreme Soviet of the Bashkir Autonomous Soviet Socialist Republic and the local Supreme Soviets. She was a delegate to the 19th All-Union Conference of the Communist Party of the Soviet Union in 1988.

== Awards ==
Valeeva received multiple awards for her work and participation in public life. In 1970, she was awarded the Jubilee Medal "In Commemoration of the 100th Anniversary of the Birth of Vladimir Ilyich Lenin"; the Medal "For Labour Valour" in 1974; the Order of Labour Glory, Third Class in 1977, which was upgraded to the Second Class in 1986 and the Medal "Veteran of Labour" in 1985. In 1998, Vasleeva was named an Honoured Builder of the Russian Federation and the title of Honorary Citizen of the City of Ufa in June 2000.
