= Darowa =

Darowa may refer to:

- Darová, a village in Břasy, Czech Republic
- Darova, Romania

== See also ==
- Eldarov or El'darova, an Azerbaijani and Russian surname
