= Eldarov =

Eldarov (Russian: Эльда́ров) is an Azerbaijani and Russian surname. The feminine variant is Eldarova (Эльда́рова). El'darov and El'darova are alternative transliterations.

It may refer to:

- Omar Eldarov (born 1927), Azerbaijani sculptor
- Roza Eldarova (1923–2021), Soviet Dagestani politician
