= Novoladozhsky =

Novoladozhsky (masculine), Novoladozhskaya (feminine), or Novoladozhskoye (neuter) may refer to:

- Novoladozhsky Uyezd, name of Volkhovsky Uyezd of St. Petersburg Governorate (previously in Novgorod Viceroyalty) in the Russian Empire and the early Russian SFSR in 1923–1927
- Novoladozhskoye Urban Settlement, a municipal formation corresponding to Novoladozhskoye Settlement Municipal Formation, an administrative division of Volkhovsky District of Leningrad Oblast, Russia
