= Galina Bogdanova =

- Галина Богданова
- Born: Khanifa Sirazhevna Iskandarov; 19 February 1925; Lyomasar, Novoladozhsky Uyezd, Saint Petersburg Governorate, Russian SFSR, Soviet Union
- Died: 9 September 2013 (aged 88); Ufa, Russia
- Occupations: Grinder; Production leader
- Awards: Medal "For Labour Valour"; Order of the October Revolution; Hero of Socialist Labour; Order of Lenin

Galina Mikhaylovna Bogdanova (Russian: Галина Михайловна Богданова; 19 February 1925 – 9 September 2013) was a Russian grinder and production leader. She worked at the Ufa Engine-Building Plant (today the Ufa Engine Building Production Association) from 1941 to her retirement in 1980. Bogdanova was a recipient of the Medal "For Labour Valour", the Order of the October Revolution and the title of Hero of Socialist Labour with the Order of Lenin.

== Early life ==
Bogdanova was born in the village of Lyomasar, Novoladozhsky Uyezd, Saint Petersburg Governorate on 19 February 1925. She was a member of a peasant family of the Romanovs. Bogdanova was the daughter of Mikhail Petrovich Romanov and Anna Sergeyevna. She had two brothers and she, her mother and younger brother were evacuated away from Leningrad to the city of Ufa in July 1941 during the Great Patriotic War. Bogdanova did seven years of education.

== Career ==
She began working as a grinder at the Ufa Engine-Building Plant (today the Ufa Engine Building Production Association) of the Ministry of Aviation Industry in the Bashkir Autonomous Soviet Socialist Republic on 16 July 1941, eventually becoming a qualified specialist in grinding. She also became a senior planner at the plant as well as a polisher. Constantly improving her skills and expertise, Bogdanova consistently met production quotas by 120 to 125 percent and delivered high-quality products she manufactured on first delivery. She worked under the motto, "To produce more, better quality products, at lower costs." During the Ninth five-year plan between 1971 and 1975, Bogdanova was an active participant in the socialist competition for the early completion of the Five-Year Plan, succeeding in four years. From January 1975, Bogdanova started to work toward the Tenth five-year plan. Subsequently, she reconsidered her earlier commitments and asked for a 20 percent increase in production quotas.

She was an deputy representing the Dmitrovsky Electoral District No. 4, Kalininsky District, Ufa in the seventh convocation of the Supreme Soviet of the Bashkir Autonomous Soviet Socialist Republic from 1967 to 1971. Bogdanova retired in 1980 after working at the plant for almost 40 years. She died in Ufa on 9 September 2013 and was buried at the city's Northern Cemetery.

== Awards ==
Bogdanova was a recipient of the Medal "For Labour Valour" on 20 February 1944 and of the Order of the October Revolution on 26 April 1971. She was awarded the title of Hero of Socialist Labour with the Order of Lenin and the "Hammer and Sickle" gold medal on 19 December 1975 among other medals.
