= Viktor Litvinov =

Soviet aircraft designer

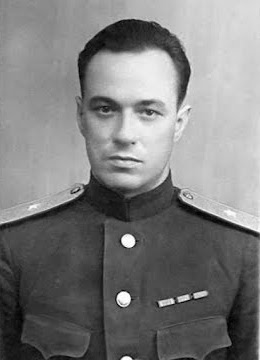

Viktor Yakovlevich Litvinov (Russian: Виктор Яковлевич Литвинов, 30 April 1910 – 4 June 1983) was a Soviet Russian aircraft designer and organizer of the aircraft industry.

== Early life ==
Viktor Litvinov was born in the city of Taganrog in 1910. In 1930 he completed his studies at the Taganrog Aviation Technical School and was assigned to the Aviation Factory Number 1 in Moscow as a technical engineer in the assembly shop. He graduated from the Moscow Aviation Institute (MAI) in 1937. In 1938 he was appointed the chief engineer of the Aviation Factory Number 1.

== Accomplishments ==
In 1938, Litvinov introduced the new system of project development, featuring prefabricated stocks with unified elements. This made a considerable economy of metal and reduced the cycles of stocks production. In 1940, he introduced the parallelism principle into the aircraft building industry: the preparations for the start of production were made simultaneously with design works and production of the new machine's plans. After the start of World War II and the evacuation of the factory to Kuybyshev, Litvinov organized the mass production of the Ilyushin Il-2, introducing the new principle of the conveyor line with both planes and stocks moving on the conveyor band. This innovation was further introduced into all aircraft factories of the USSR and Litvinov was appointed director of the factory in 1944. From 1965 to 1973, he served as Deputy Minister of General Engineering of the USSR.

== Awards ==
- Twice Hero of Socialist Labour
- Five Orders of Lenin
- Two Orders of the Red Banner of Labour
- Medal "For Labour Valour"
- Two Stalin Prizes in 1946 and 1950.
