= Valentina Gaganova =

Russian-Soviet textile worker and politician

- Валентина Гаганова
- Born: Valentina Ivanovna Gaganova; 3 January 1932; Tsiribushevo, Spirovsky District, Tver Oblast, Russian SFSR
- Died: 25 October 2010 (aged 78); Vyshny Volochyok, Tver Oblast, Russia
- Occupations: Textile worker Politician
- Years active: 1940s–2010
- Awards: Order of Lenin (x2); Hero of Socialist Labour; Medal "For Labour Valour" (x2); Order of the October Revolution; Order of Honour

Valentina Ivanovna Gaganova (Russian: Валентина Ивановна Гаганова; 3 January 1932 – 25 October 2010) was a Russian and Soviet textile worker and politician who was shop foreman of the Vyshnevolotsk cotton mill. In order to bring lagging areas up to the level of advanced ones, she started a movement that was extensively implemented in the Soviet Union and other socialist countries. Gaganova was twice elected to serve on the Central Committee of the Communist Party of the Soviet Union for ten years and was an elected deputy of the Council of the Union of the Supreme Soviet of the Soviet Union for four years. She received various awards such as the Order of Lenin, the Hero of Socialist Labour, the Medal "For Labour Valour", the Order of the October Revolution and the Order of Honour.

== Early life ==
On 3 January 1932, Gaganova was born in the village of Tsiribushevo in the Spirovsky District of the Tver Oblast. She was the second oldest of five children in her family, and grew up in poverty. When Gaganova's father was killed in Second World War action in 1942, close to Rzhev, she was ten years old. As a result, she had to work on the family farm to help support them. In 1946, she graduated from the seven-year No. 8. Spirov railway boarding school.

== Career ==
Gaganova resided with her aunt in Kovrov, Vladimir Oblast, where she worked as a turner in an arms plant during the war. After graduation, she relocated to Vyshny Volochyok, Kalinin Oblast (now the Tver Oblast), in 1949, where she worked as a yarn remover at the Vyshnevolotsk cotton mill to support her mother. Gaganova was chosen to serve as the shift's Komsomol organisation's secretary on a group committee. The manufacturing school graduates who organised the Komsomol youth brigade appointed her as its foreman. In order to raise the coefficient of usable time when operating spinning machines, Gaganova's team had to catch up with the other advanced teams.

Although she was happy with the development, she saw that almost half of the factory's teams lacked organisation and did not utilise time efficiently. Gaganova requested a transfer to a lagging brigade in a statement to the Party Committee in October 1958. After receiving approval from the Party Committee, she divided the work into teams, allowing them to quickly move to the level of highly efficient advanced teams.

The new initiative was utilised across the factory, in Vyshny Volochok, and throughout the entire Upper Volga region because it was warmly received by various workers. Many workers in the Soviet Union and other socialist countries afterwards embraced it. She graduated from evening textile college in 1967. Gaganova spent her final years at the mill as its deputy director for educational work with the youth and led the department of rationalisation and inventions. After 25 years as a planner and 13 years as a shop foreman, she retired in 1990.

Gaganova became a member of the Communist Party of the Soviet Union in 1957 and of the Central Committee of the All-Union Central Council of Trade Unions in 1960. At the 22nd (1961) and 23rd (1966) Congresses of the Communist Party of the Soviet Union, she was elected a member of the Central Committee of the Communist Party of the Soviet Union. Gaganova ultimately served ten years on the Central Committee between 1961 and 1971. From 1962 to 1966, she was an elected deputy of the sixth convocation of the Council of the Union of the Supreme Soviet of the Soviet Union. Gaganova was a member of the Presidium of the Vyshnevolotsk Council of Veterans of the Great Patriotic War and Labour in her retirement.

== Personal life ==
She died on 25 October 2010 in Vyshny Volochyok. Gaganova received a memorial service at Vyshnevolotskiy Drama Theater three days later, and was buried at Vyshnevolotsk Old City Cemetery.

== Honours ==
She received the title of Hero of Socialist Labour with the Order of Lenin and the "Hammer and Sickle" gold medal "for a selfless example of selfless service to the interests of Soviet society" by a decree of the Supreme Soviet of the Soviet Union on 8 July 1959. Gaganova earned the Medal "For Labour Valour" twice on 26 September 1957 and 26 April 1963. She was awarded the Order of Lenin a second time on 4 January 1970 and the Order of the October Revolution on 4 May 1971.

Gaganova was given the title of Honoured Worker of the Textile and Light Industry of the RSFSR on 6 December 1981 and received the Honorary Diploma of the Presidium of the Supreme Soviet of the RSFSR on 28 January 1987. In 1997, she was made an honorary citizen of the city of Vyshny Volochyok and of the Spirovsky District seven years later. Gaganova was given the Order of Honour on 1 July 1999. A memorial plaque was installed on her home in Vyshny Volochyok.
