= Victor Nosach =

Soviet historian (1929-2011)

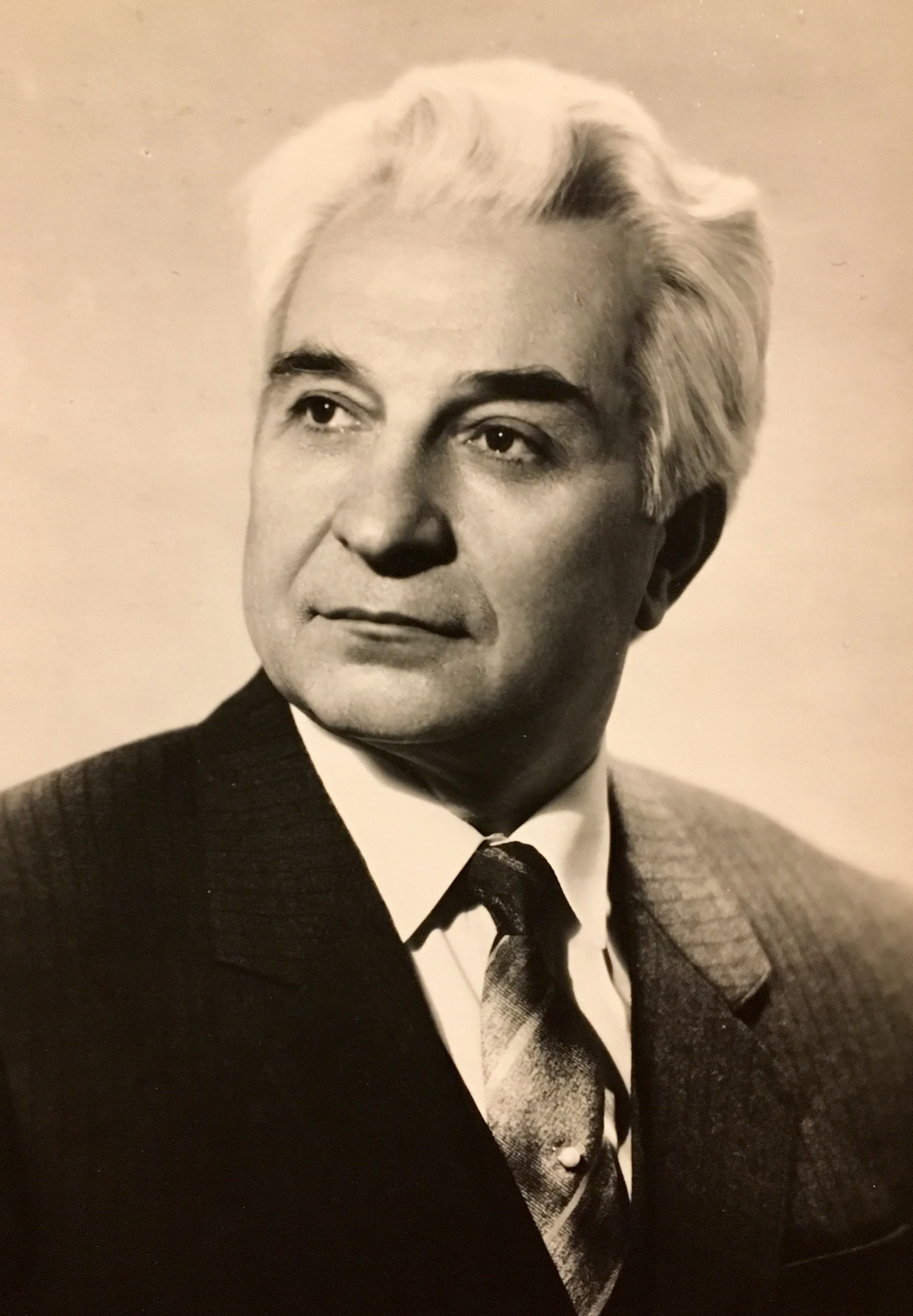
- Born: 8 December 1929; Fyodorovka, Soviet Union
- Died: 7 May 2011 (aged 81); Saint-Petersburg, Russian Federation
- Education: National University of Kharkiv
- Known for: research on the history of workers and trade unions of Russia
- Awards: Order of Honour (Russia) Order of Friendship of Peoples Medal "For Labour Valour"
- Scientific career
- Fields: History
- Workplaces: Saint-Petersburg University of Humanities and Social Sciences

Victor Ivanovich Nosach (December 8, 1929, in Fyodorovka village in Novovodolazhskiy district of Kharkiv Oblast – May 7, 2011 in Saint-Petersburg, Russia) was a Soviet and Russian historian, Doctor of Historian Sciences, Member of the Academy of Humanitarian Sciences, Honored Scientist of Russian Federation.

Known as a chronicler of the history of workers and trade union of Russia, he created the fundamentals of the science of trade unions in Soviet Union.

He worked in Leningrad High Trade Union School of Culture, Saint-Petersburg University of Humanities and Social Sciences.

== Biography ==
Victor Ivanovich Nosach was born in Ukraine, from 1946 - 1952 he served Chernomorskiy Fleet in Odessa. In 1958 he graduated from Leningrad High Trade Union School of Culture, in 1959 he graduated from National University of Kharkiv Department of History, in 1963 he graduated from the post graduate school of Moscow High School of trade Unions.

He is an author of more than 25 manuscripts and books and more than 300 scientific articles about history of workers and trade unions of Russia, about cultural and educational activity of trade unions.

For more than 50 years he taught in Saint-Petersburg University of Humanities and Social Sciences, a successor of Leningrad High Trade Union School of Culture.

He was awarded the Order of Friendship of Peoples, the Order of Honour (Russia), the Medal "For Labour Valour", the medal for Labor Prowess and others.

Died in car accident on May 7, 2011 in Saint-Petersburg, buried on Volkovo Cemetery.
