= Agostino Roscelli =

Italian priest

Saint Agostino Roscelli
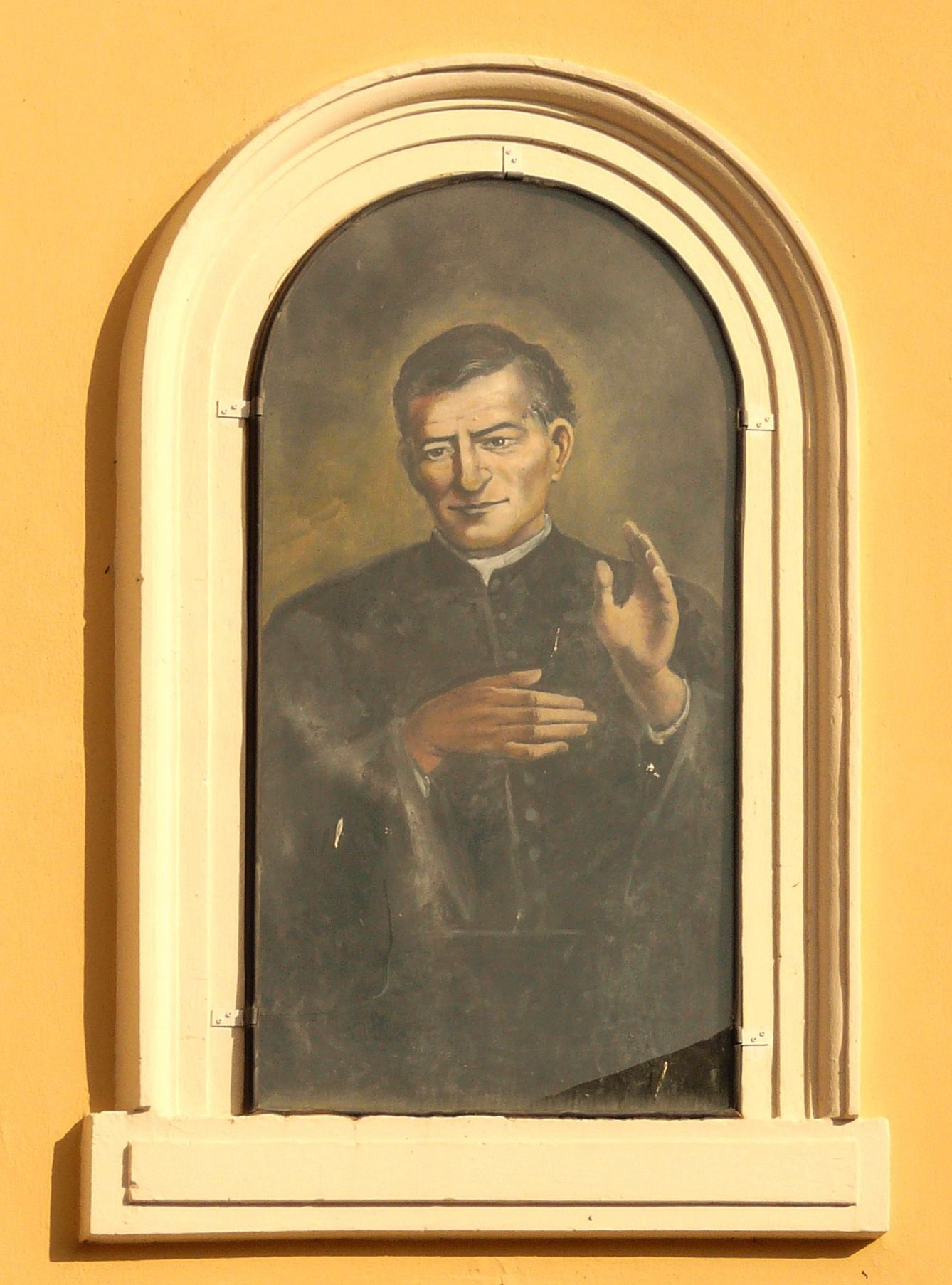
- Painting of Roscelli in Liguria, Italy

Priest
- Born: 27 July 1818; Bargone, Casarza Ligure, Italy
- Died: 7 May 1902 (aged 83); Genoa, Liguria, Italy
- Venerated in: Catholic Church
- Beatified: 7 May 1995 by Pope John Paul II
- Canonized: 10 June 2001 by Pope John Paul II
- Feast: 7 May

Agostino Roscelli (27 July 1818 – 7 May 1902), also known as Augustine Roscelli, and Augustin Roscelli, was an Italian priest who inspired social change in Genoa, Italy for children and disadvantaged women. He was canonized a saint in the Catholic Church in 2001 by Pope John Paul II.

== Life ==
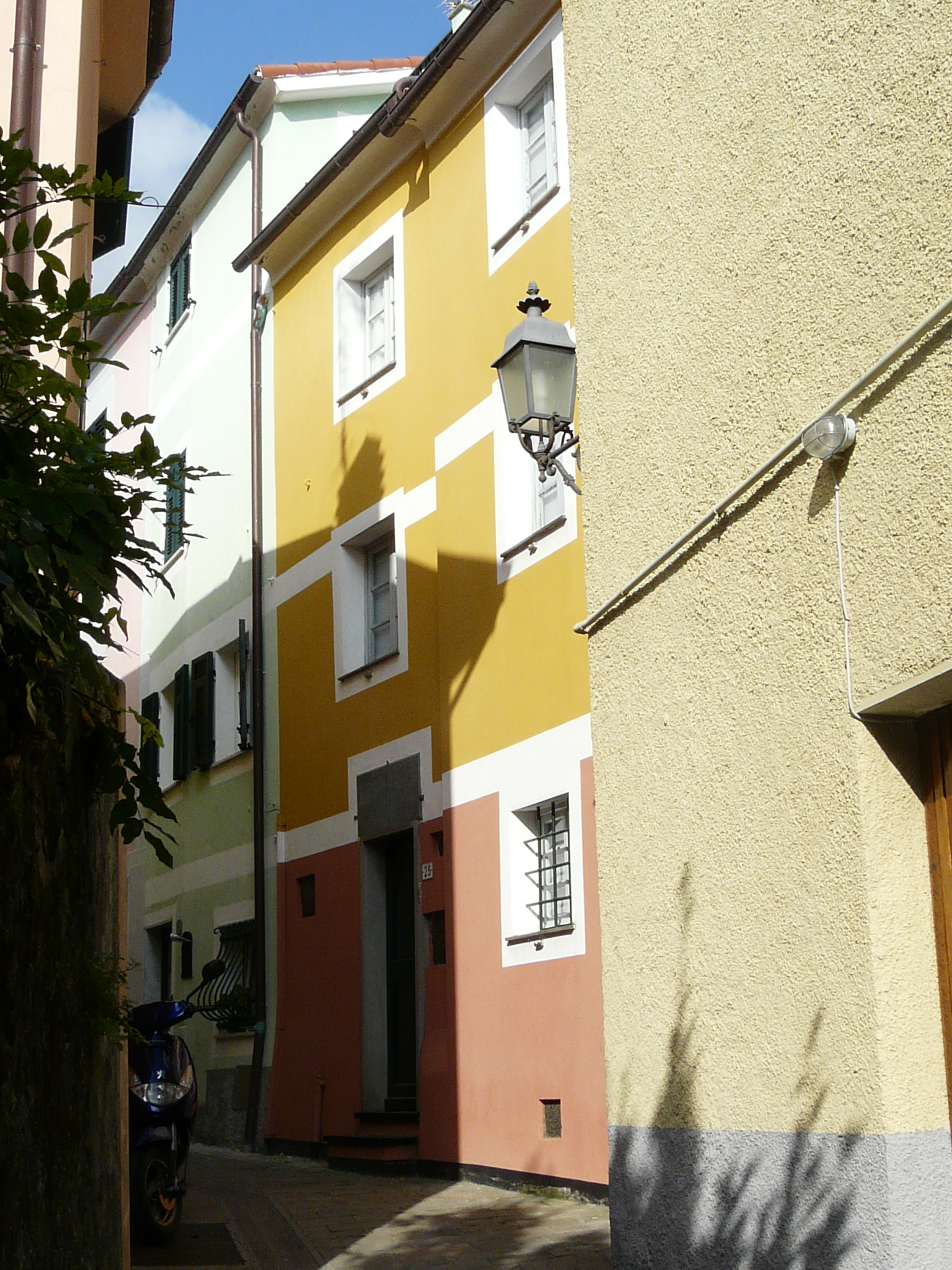
Birthplace of St. Agostino Roscelli in Bargone, Italy.

On 27 July 1818, Roscelli was born in Bargone de Casarza, in Liguria, in northern Italy. His parents, Domenico Roscelli and Maria Gianelli, had him baptized the same day out of fear that he might not survive. Despite his early health problems, Roscelli would grow into a quiet intellectual, receiving his basic education from the parish priest, Andrea Garibaldi. These times were brief however, as he would spend a large part of his childhood caring for his poor farming family's sheep in the mountains. During these solitary times, he would fill his hours with prayer.

In May 1835, at the age of 17, Roscelli attended a parish mission given by a visiting priest, Antonio Maria Gianelli (parish priest of Chiavari and later bishop of Bobbio). This mission thoroughly convinced him he had a call to the priesthood, a calling that would not be easy considering the poor financial state his family was in. Despite this, he attacked the situation with prayer, which led to financial aid that allowed him to study in Genoa. One of his benefactors was Fr. Guanelli, who found him a post as a sacristan and guardian of a church attached to a girls' school. He was finally ordained on 19 September 1846.

Roscelli was shortly thereafter appointed to a working-class parish, San Martino d’Albaro, in 1846. He would later move to the Church of Consolation in Genoa in 1854. As a parish priest he soon made a positive impression with his obvious zeal and austerity in life. He spent long hours in the confessional, which developed his deep concern for the youth of the area. The boys of the parish were often tempted into a life of crime, having little to no education. The girls were even worse off, having less education than the boys, and were liable to seek menial work in the city, often becoming prostitutes.

Seeing a great need for change, Roscelli set about forming a new type of job training for girls. He gathered together a group of young women, and with them founded a "sewing workshop", in which girls could receive practical and professional training as well as Christian instruction. Not wanting to neglect the boys, he would also found a "young craftsman" institute for them in 1858. He would later go on to establish a residential school to train young women who might otherwise starve or become prostitutes.

In 1872 Agostino began a ministry to prisoners, working especially with those condemned to death. Two years later, in 1874, he was appointed Warden and Chaplain of the new provincial orphanage, Monte dei Fieschine, a post he held for 22 years. During that time he would baptize over 8,000 children, as well as providing care for young single mothers.

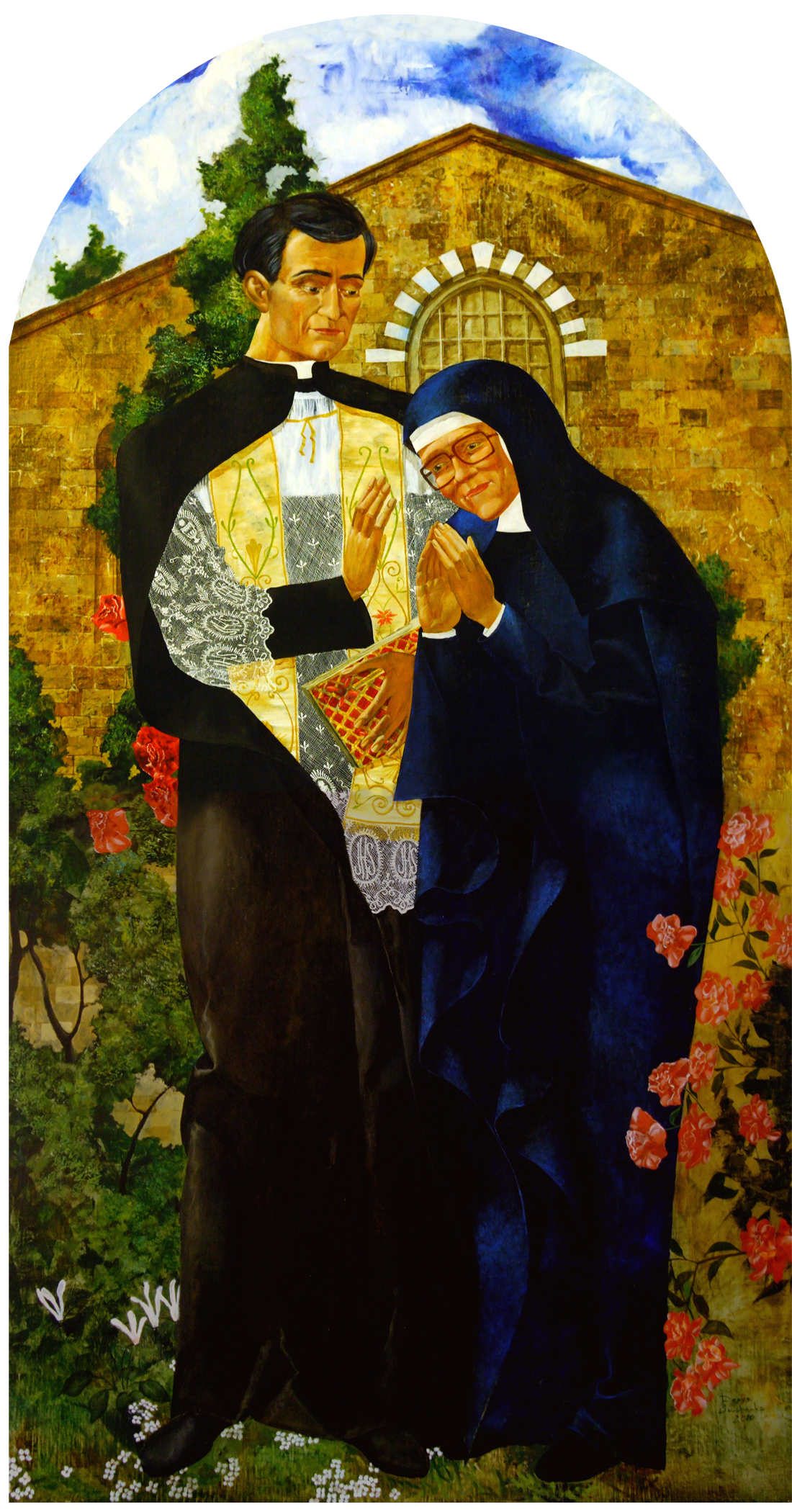
Agostino Roscelli. Painted by artist Denys Savchenko. Work is exposed at the St. Peter and St. Therese of the Child Jesus Church, Genoa, Italy.

He lived in an atmosphere of intense prayer, something that would inspire those around him, and especially his helpers. The women who ran the sewing workshop, known as "Roscelli's Collaborators", decided their mission would be greatly helped if they were to consecrate themselves to Christ in a more formal way. Roscelli was reluctant to start a religious congregation, but was encouraged to seek the advice and approval of Pope Pius IX.

Pope Pius IX's reply was simple: "May God bless you and your good works". This was what Roscelli needed however, and he would go on to found the Institute of Sisters of the Immaculata on 15 October 1876.

Roscelli would induct the first of the nuns a week later, going on to act as their spiritual director. He would oversee the early growth of the order beyond Genoa, and eventually beyond Italy.

Till the very end of his life, Roscelli would describe himself simply as a "poor priest", ever humble as to his accomplishments. On 7 May 1902, he died of natural causes in Genoa. He was 83 years old.

== Sainthood ==
The road to sainthood started for Roscelli on 18 January 1932, when the informative, or information gathering process began. His cause was formally opened on 29 May 1939, and he was given the title Servant of God. The review of his spiritual writings began on 29 October 1941.

After nearly 50 more years, his cause for sainthood was officially declared on 11 September 1980. Nine years later, on 21 December 1989, Roscelli was declared Venerable by Pope John Paul II in a decree of heroic virtues.

=== Beatification ===
On 17 May 1995, Roscelli was officially declared Blessed by Pope John Paul II.

A spiritual feature characteristic of Blessed Agostino Roscelli…was to work at the service of his brothers and sisters without ever neglecting his interior union with the Lord. The true contemplative is the one who is able to work with greater force and incisiveness for the salvation of souls and the good of the Church. The new blessed’s apostolic activity was truly fruitful because it flowed from a genuine mystical and contemplative life. His ardent love for God, enriched by the gift of wisdom, enabled him to give himself as far as possible to serving his neighbor without ever being separated from the Lord.

— Pope John Paul II at the beatification ceremony of Agostino Roscelli

=== Canonization ===
99 years after his death, Roscelli was officially declared a saint by Pope John Paul II on 10 June 2001.

'Great is his love for us.' The love of God for men is manifested with particular clarity in the life of St. Augustine Roscelli, whom we contemplate today in the splendor of holiness. Its existence, all imbued with deep faith, can be considered a gift offered to the glory of God and for the good of souls. It was the faith to make it always obedient to the Church and its teachings, in docile adherence to the Pope and to their own bishop. By faith he knew how to draw comfort in sad, in the harsh difficulty, and in painful events. Faith was the solid rock to which he held on tightly to not give in to discouragement. This same faith felt it his duty to communicate to others, especially to those who approached the ministry of confession. He became a master of the spiritual life, especially for the sisters that he founded, which saw him serene even in the most trying situations. St. Augustine Roscelli exhorts us always to trust in God, immersing us in the mystery of his love.

— Pope John Paul II’s homily at the canonization of Agostino Roscelli, 10 June 2001.

== Gallery ==
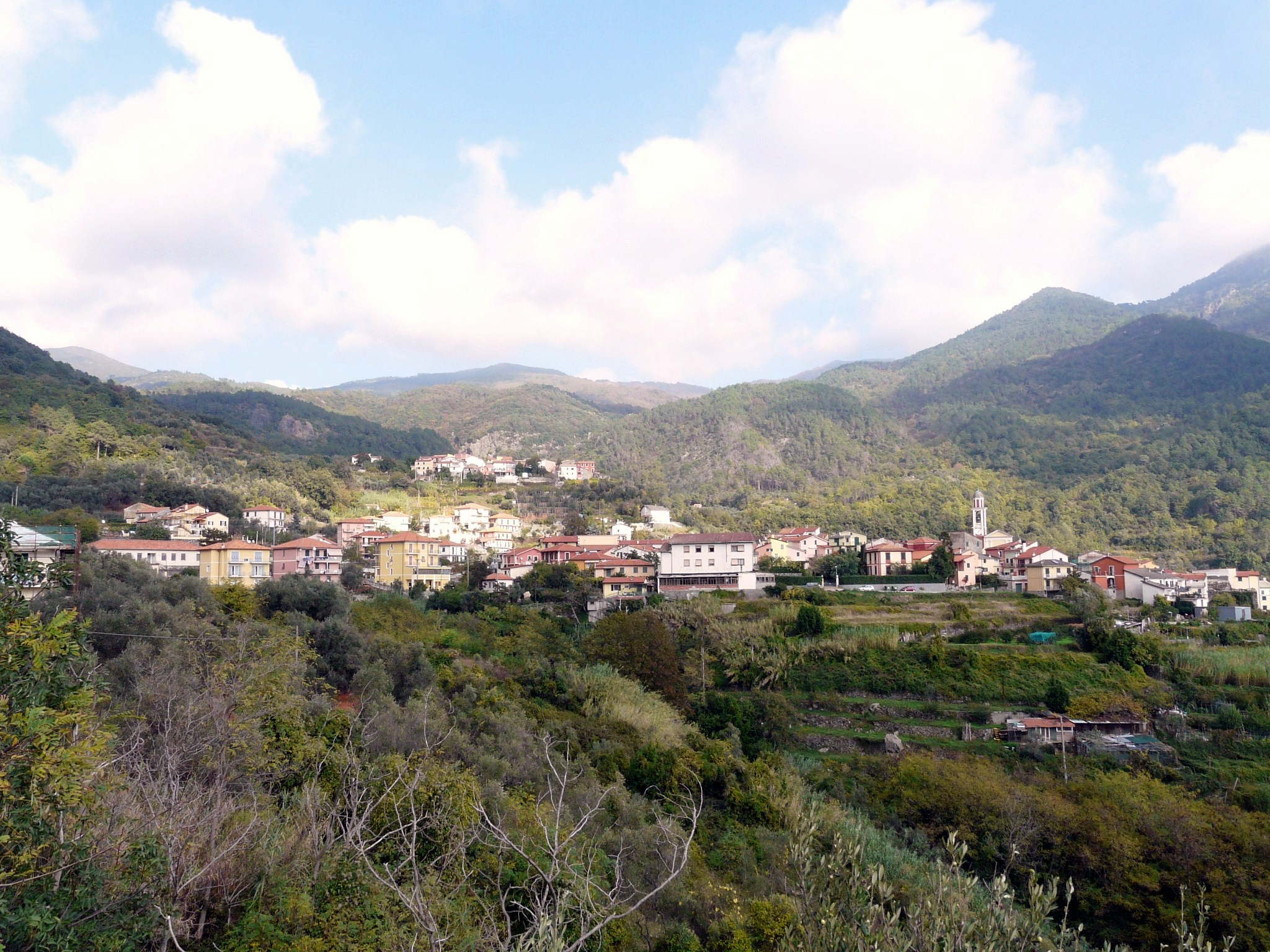
Panoramic view of Bargone, Italy.

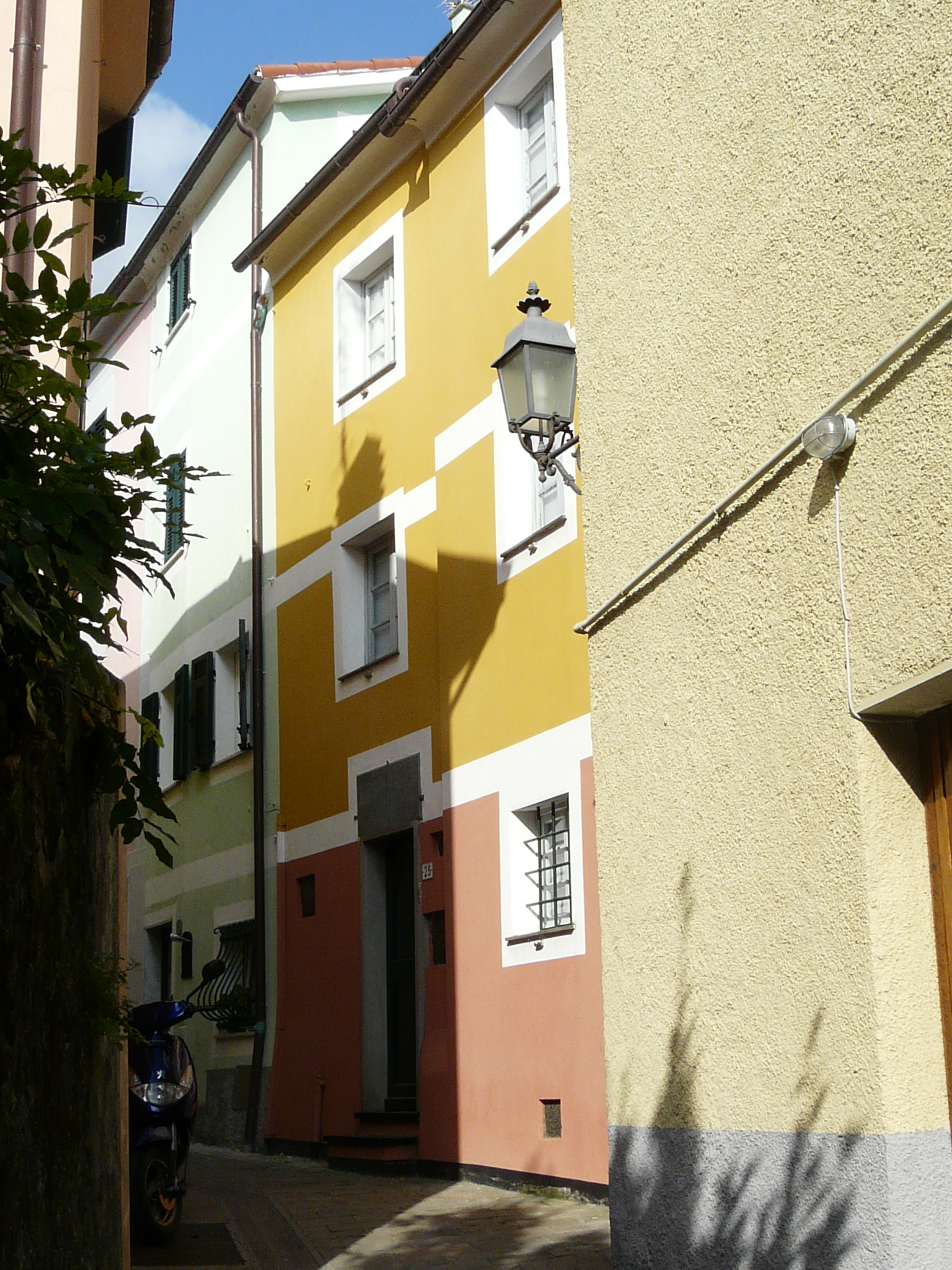
Birthplace of St. Agostino Roscelli in Bargone, Italy.

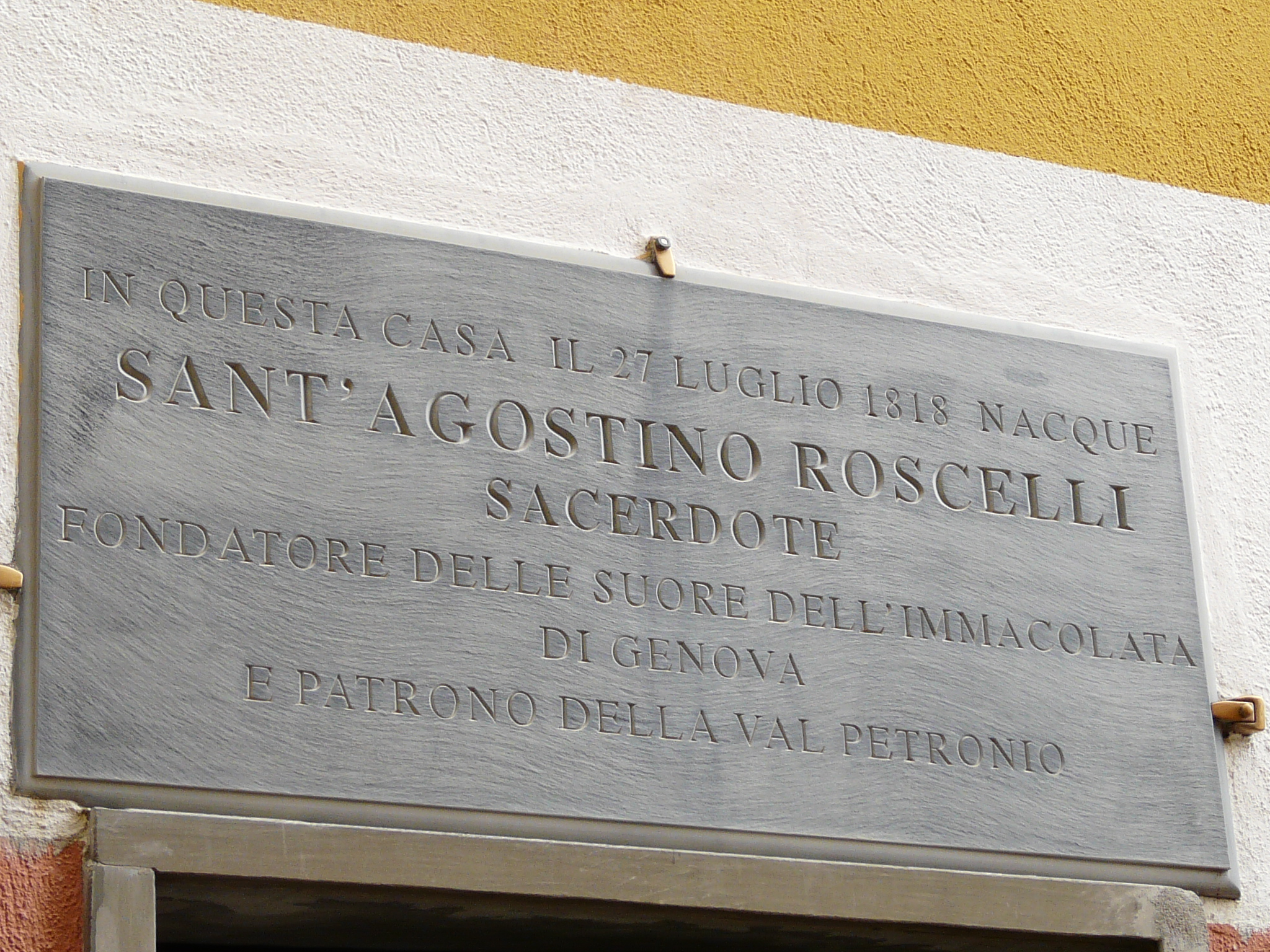
Plaque marking the birthplace of St. Agostino Roscelli in Bargone, Italy.
