= Brettina =

Bahamian singer-songwriter, model, and actress (born 1970)

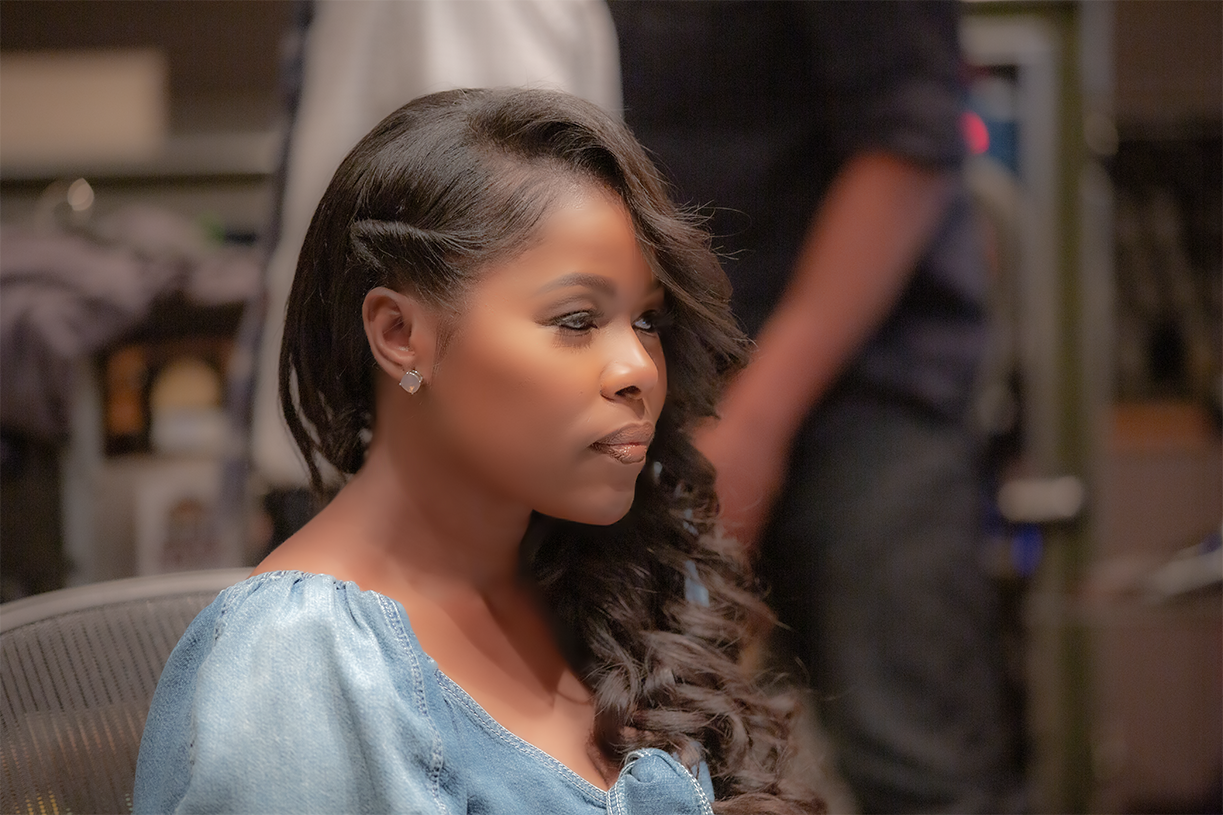
- Brettina at Capitol Records Studio A

Background information
- Born: Brettina Lorena Robinson; December 8, 1970 (age 55); Nassau, Bahamas
- Genres: Jazz, smooth jazz
- Occupations: Singer-songwriter, actress, print model
- Instrument: Vocals
- Years active: 2010–present
- Label: Floating Bridge Media (independent)
- Website: https://brettina.com

Brettina Lorena Robinson (born December 8, 1970, in Nassau, Bahamas) is a Bahamian singer-songwriter, model, and actress, based in Los Angeles.

== Early life ==
Brettina began singing at age four, under the influence of her mother, as well as her uncles, Theo and Kirk Coakley of the popular 1970 Funk/Soul group T-Connection.

While attending secondary school in the Bahamas, she won the eponymous "Miss C.I. Gibson", making her eligible for "Miss Bahamas Talented Teen", which she subsequently won, earning her a scholarship to attend the University of Washington.

== Musical style and career ==
Brettina sings jazz, and describes her style as "organic" and cites as her main influences Nancy Wilson, Sarah Vaughan, Shirley Horn, Shirley Bassey, Sade, Adele, Diana Krall, Brenda Russell, Corinne Bailey Rae, Tiwa Savage and LIRA.

She draws from personal experience in her songwriting. For example, she cites her poor childhood as the inspiration for her song "Poor Old Times", and childhood memories as the inspiration for her cover of Island in the Sun".

As a singer, she has performed mainly in the Seattle and Los Angeles areas. She has performed at:

- Supermodel of the Bahamas show, with Bahamian R&B singer Julien;
- Kirkland Performance Center "New Face of Jazz" concert in November 2010;
- "Up Close & Unplugged" concert on January 26, 2011.

In addition to her jazz career, she has worked as a print model and an actress in national advertisements.

== Pageant wins ==
- Miss C.I. Gibson, pageant winner.
- The Hal Jackson Miss Talented Teen Bahamas, pageant winner.

== Discography ==
Studio albums: Brettina - Self titled debut album (2010), New Day - EP released in 2021.

- Brettina (2010)
  - "Paradise"
  - "Bahamian Girl"
  - "The Bug"
  - "Serafina"
  - "Poor Old Times"
  - "Chai"
  - "My Time to Shine"
  - "Pardon the Storm"
  - "Island in the Sun"
  - "One"
  - "Serafina" (bonus track with strings)
- Bop Baiyé - Single released in 2019.
- New Day - EP released in 2021.
  - "New Day"
  - "Low"
  - "Simple Pleasures"
  - "Bop Baiyé"
- Simple Pleasures Remixes - Released in 2022.
  - "Simple Pleasures (Incognito Radio Edit)"
  - "Simple Pleasures (Incognito Mix)"
  - "Simple Pleasures (IYakul Remix)"
  - "Simple Pleasures (Ski Oakenfull Dub)"
