= Medal "For Labour Valour" =

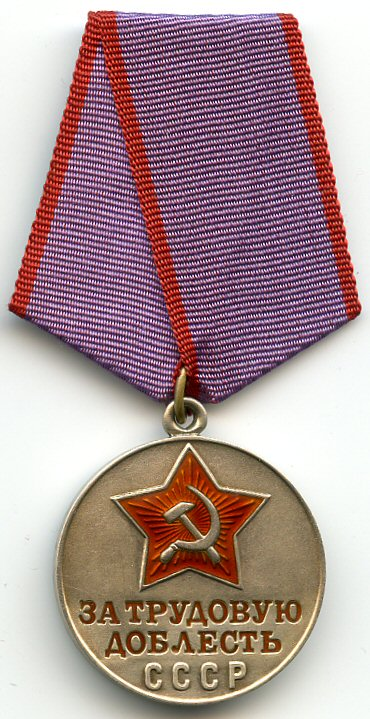
- Medal "For Labour Valour" (obverse)
- Type: Civilian efficiency medal
- Country: Soviet Union
- Presented by: USSR
- Eligibility: Soviet citizens and foreign nationals
- Established: December 27, 1938
- First award: January 15, 1939

Highlights
- Total: 1,825,100
- Ribbon of the "Medal For Labour Valour"

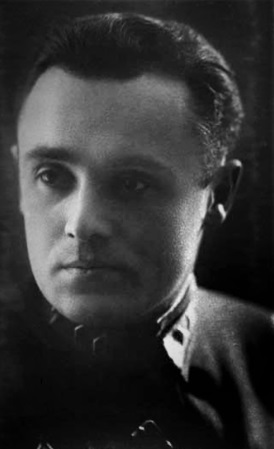
Rocket engineer and spacecraft designer Sergei Korolev, a recipient of the Medal "For Labour Valour"

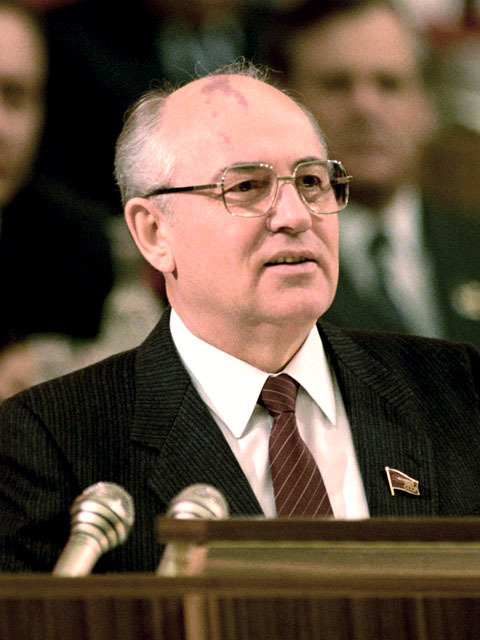
General Secretary of the Communist Party of the Soviet Union Mikhail Gorbachev, a recipient of the Medal "For Labour Valour"

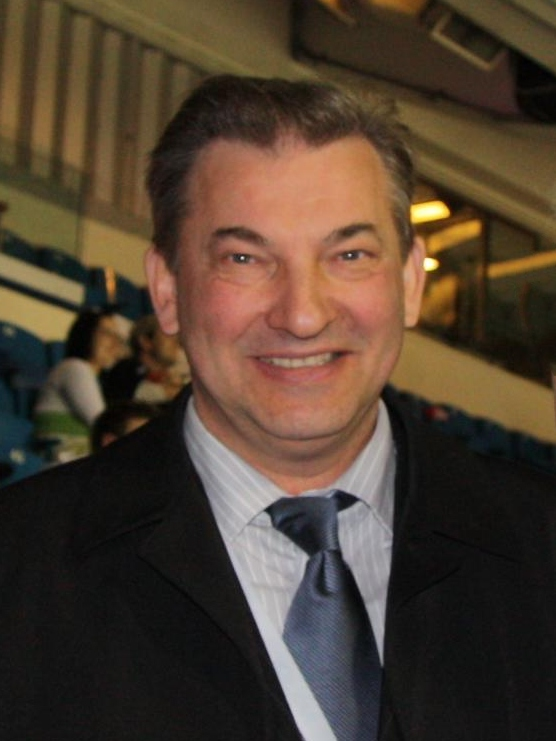
Star hockey goaltender Vladislav Tretiak, a recipient of the Medal "For Labour Valour"

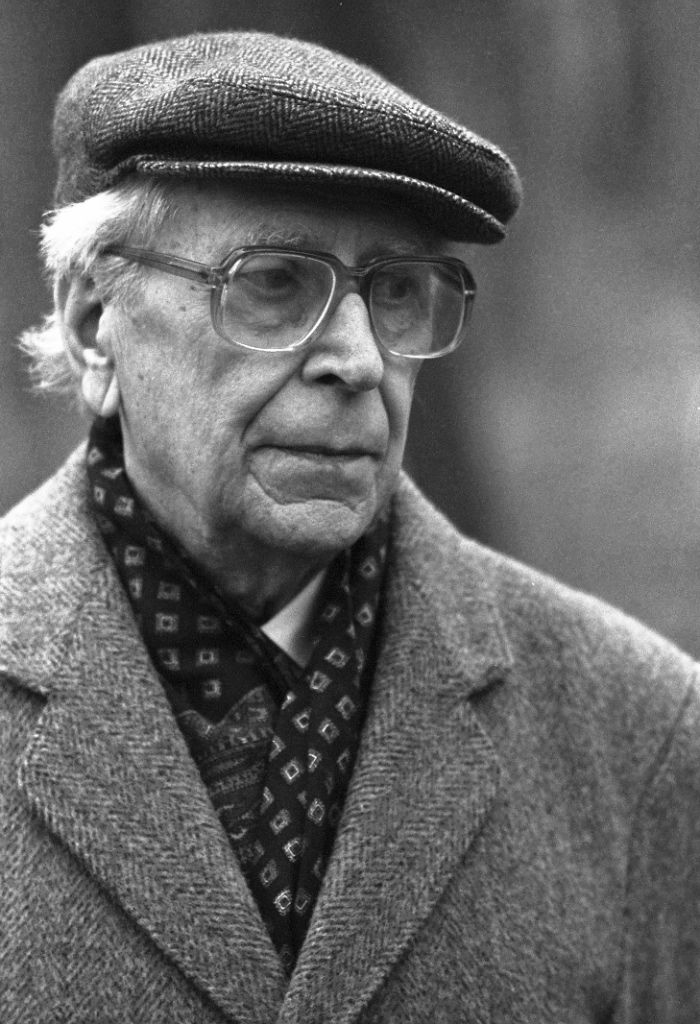
Eminent scholar Dmitry Likhachov, a recipient of the Medal "For Labour Valour"

The Medal "For Labour Valour" (Russian: Медаль «За трудовую доблесть», romanised: Medal "Za trudovuyu doblest") was a civilian labour award of the Soviet Union bestowed to especially deserving workers to recognise and honour dedicated and valorous labour or significant contributions in the fields of science, culture or the manufacturing industry. It was established on December 27, 1938, by decree of the Presidium of the Supreme Soviet of the USSR. During its existence, its statute was amended three times by further decrees, first on June 19, 1943 to amend its description and ribbon, then on December 16, 1947 to amend its regulations, and finally on July 18, 1980 to confirm all previous amendments. During its existence of just over fifty years, it was bestowed to almost two million deserving citizens. The medal ceased to be awarded following the December 1991 dissolution of the Soviet Union.

== Medal statute ==
The Medal "For Labour Valour" was awarded to workers, farmers, specialists of the national economy, workers of science, culture, education, health and other to citizens of the USSR, and in exceptional cases, to foreign nationals, for:

- selfless and creative work, for surpassing norms, targets and socialist obligations, for increased productivity and improvements in product quality;
- effective use of new technologies and the development of advanced technologies, for valuable innovations and rationalisation proposals;
- achievements in science, culture, literature, the arts, education, health, trade, catering, housing and communal services, public services, in other areas of employment;
- fruitful work in the communist education and training of young people, for successful public and social activities;
- achievements in the field of physical culture and sports.

The Medal "For Labour Valour" was worn on the left side of the chest and in the presence of other medals of the USSR, immediately after the Nakhimov Medal. If worn in the presence of awards of the Russian Federation, the latter have precedence.

== Medal description ==
The Medal "For Labour Valour" was a 34 mm in diameter (some struck in 1945 measured 35 mm) circular medal struck from .925 silver with a raised rim on both sides. In the upper obverse, a ruby-red enamelled 19.2 mm wide five pointed star with a silver hammer and sickle at its centre. Below the star, the inscription in two rows of sunken and red enamelled 2.8 mm high letters "FOR VALOUR LABOUR" (Russian: «ЗА ТРУДОВУЮ ДОБЛЕСТЬ»), at the very bottom, the relief inscription in 3.3 mm high letters "USSR" (Russian: «СССР»). On the otherwise plain reverse, the relief inscription on two rows of 2.5 mm high letters "LABOUR IN THE USSR - A MATTER OF HONOUR" (Russian: «ТРУД В СССР — ДЕЛО ЧЕСТИ»).

Early awards hung from a small triangular mount covered with a red ribbon with a threaded stub and screw for attachment to clothing. Following the 1943 decree, the Medal "For Labour Valour" was secured by a ring through the medal suspension loop to a standard Soviet pentagonal mount covered by a 24mm wide lilac coloured silk moiré ribbon with 2 mm wide red edge stripes.

1938–1943	1938–1943	1943–1991	1943–1991
Obverse	Reverse	Obverse	Reverse

== Recipients (partial list) ==
The first investiture took place on January 15, 1939, where the Medal "For Labour Valour" was presented to 22 employees of the Kalinin armaments plant number 8 for exceptional service to the country in the creation and development of new weapons for the Workers' and Peasants' Red Army.

The individuals below were recipients of the Medal "For Labour Valour".

- Olympic medalist and "Master of Sport" Vladimir Aliverovich Nazlymov
- Geochemist, academician and "Hero of Socialist Labour" Nikolay Vasilyevich Belov
- Actor and clown, "People's Artist of the USSR" and "Hero of Socialist Labour" Yuri Vladimirovich Nikulin
- Olympic medalist and "Master of Sports" Vladimir Mikhaylovich Barnashov
- Chairman of the Soviet and then Russian Central Bank Viktor Vladimirovich Gerashchenko
- Artillery specialist and strategist Ivan Fedorovich Ladyga
- Actor, director, artist, designer, puppet-maker, master puppeteer Nikolai Viktorovich Zykov
- Rocket engineer and spacecraft designer Sergei Pavlovich Korolev
- Mathematician and physicist Sergey Pavlovich Kurdyumov
- Ice Hockey Olympic medalist Nikolai Mikhailovich Sologubov
- Writer and author Chingiz Akif oglu Abdullayev
- Chess grandmaster Yuri Lvovich Averbakh
- Olympic medalist gymnast Nikolai Yefimovich Andrianov
- Scientist and linguist Gabdulkhay Khuramovich Akhatov
- Actress "People's Artist of the USSR" Zhanneta "Zhanna" Trofymovna Prokhorenko
- President of the World Meteorological Organization Alexander Ivanovich Bedritsky
- Olympic medalist ski jumper "Master of Sport" Vladimir Pavlovich Belousov
- Kolkhoznik, politician and writer Yevgeniya Oleksiivna Dolinyuk
- General Secretary of the Communist Party of the Soviet Union Mikhail Sergeyevich Gorbachev
- Physicist "Hero of Socialist Labour" Alexander Sergeevich Davydov
- Army General Viktor Fyodorovich Yerin
- Aircraft designer and organiser of the aircraft industry Victor Yakovlevich Litvinov
- Scholar and foremost expert in Old Russian language and literature Dmitry Sergeyevich Likhachov
- Hockey legend goaltender Vladislav Aleksandrovich Tretiak
- Doctor of Military and Technical Sciences General Elguja Viktorovich Medzmariashvili
- Former electrical engineer President of Mordovia Nikolay Ivanovich Merkushkin
- Theatre and film actor "People's Artist" Andrei Alexandrovich Mironov
- Ice hockey Olympic medalist Vladimir Vladimirovich Petrov
- Archaeologist and historian Svetlana Alexandrovna Pletneva
- Former agronomist and President of Moldova Mircea Ion Snegur
- Theoretical physicist Arseny Alexandrovich Sokolov
- Aircraft engine designer Dr. Pavel Aleksandrovich Soloviev
- Composer of stage, orchestral, chamber, and choral works Yevhen Fedorovych Stankovych
- Champion Olympic biathlete Alexander Ivanovich Tikhonov
- Estonian educator Hein Vergo
- Linguist and philologist Akaki Gavrilovich Shanidze
- Chairwoman of the Presidium of the Supreme Soviet of the Dagestan ASSR Roza Abdulbasirovna Eldarova
- Kyrgyz poet Jolon Mamytov
- Master builder Zukhra Valeeva
- Textile worker Valentina Gaganova
- Cattle breeder and milkmaid Galina Skakun
- Grinder and production leader Galina Bogdanova
- Scientist-zootechnician and milkmaid Aleksandra Shevchenko

== See also ==
- Orders, decorations, and medals of the Soviet Union
