= Indrek Allmann =

Estonian architect

Allmann at Arvamusfestival in Paide in 2022

Indrek Allmann (born 8 December 1972) is an Estonian architect and city planner.

Allmann was born in Viljandi and attended J. Köler 4th Secondary School (Viljandi Maagümnaasium) from 1987 to 1990. He obtained his higher education in the Faculty of Architecture in the Estonian Academy of Arts from 1990 to 1999.

From 1995 to 1998, Allmann worked in the architectural bureau R. Puusepp Stuudio 911 OÜ. From 1998 to 2000, he worked as a senior architect in the architectural bureau Kolde Projekt AS and from 2000 to 2004 as a senior architect in the architectural bureau Kolde Grupp OÜ. Since 2004, Indrek Allmann has worked as the lead architect and partner in Pluss Architects. Architectural bureau Pluss OÜ was founded in 2002 and has designed more than a million square metres of public buildings, apartment buildings and private residences – both new builds as well as renovations and restorations.

Indrek Allmann has been a member of the Estonian Association of Architects since 1999. Since 2000, he has been a member of the supervisory board and from 2006 to 2010 he performed his duties as vice-chairman of the association. Indrek Allmann was the President of the Estonian Association of Architects from 2014 to 2016 and vice-president from 2016 to 2017.

== Notable works ==
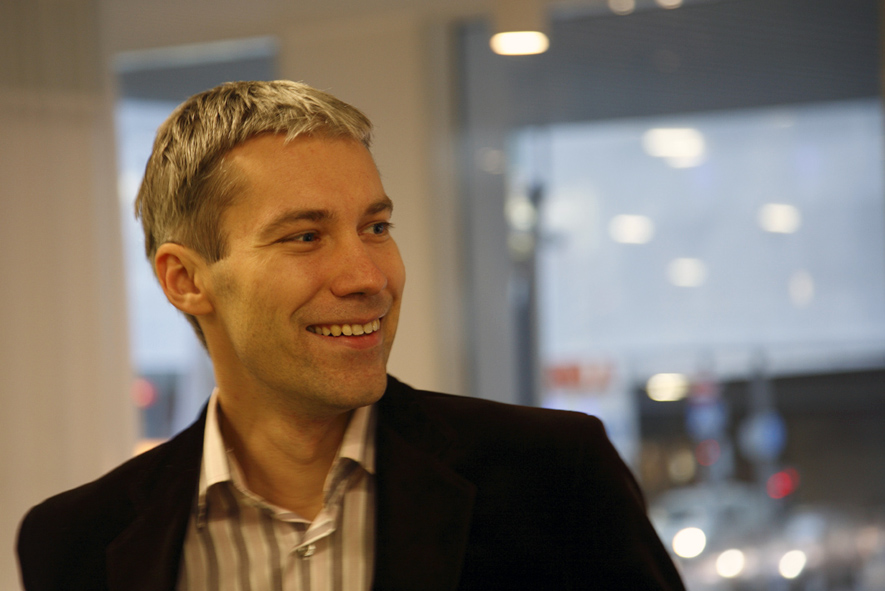
Indrek Allmann (2007)

Indrek Allmann is a spokesman for responsible design and emphasises in his work that the most environmentally friendly square metre is the one that does not need to be built. His work is characterised by a high technical level, inventive choice of materials, keen awareness of the environment and carefully thought-out structure. Allmann tries to avoid anything impractical in his work, emphasizing strongly on planning phase, for the sake of creating high-quality integrated environment.

Indrek Allmann is the primary author behind the idea of the climate-neutral Hundipea neighbourhood (and one of the project leaders). The pilot project aims to create a new climate-neutral neighbourhood in Paljassaare, Northern Tallinn. The comprehensive solution for the climate-neutral neighbourhood is created in cooperation with several stakeholders from the private and public sector, including scientists, the local community, city planners, developers, startups and the Tallinn City Government. As part of the Hundipea project, Indrek Allmann participates in the activities of the collaboration platform for environmental awareness called Rohetiiger (the Green Tiger).

Indrek Allmann is known as a visionary for many extensive infrastructure developments. In cooperation with architect Jaan Jagomägi, and Futudesign architects Risto Wimberg and Teemu Seppänen, Allmann highlighted the need for smart direction of the urban impact of the Tallinn-Helsinki tunnel. Allmann is also one of the authors of the Rail Baltic Pärnu terminal. The authors of the winning design "Water Strider" of the international architectural competition for the terminal are Indrek Allmann, Jaan Jagomägi, Gunnar Kurusk, Tanno Tammesson and Holden Vides. The conceptual design for the Talsinki tunnel and the design for the Rail Baltic Pärnu terminal were presented at the 2016 Venice Biennale of Architecture as part of the joint exhibition "Balti Atlas" by the three Baltic states.

Other well-known works from Allmann are the concept for the Noblessner harbour area and the Lurich quarter in Ülemiste City, Tallinn. He has also garnered recognition for Hotel L’Ermitage in Tallinn, Tulbi-Veeriku apartment buildings, and the church complex of the Tartu St. Luke's UMC in Tartu, Eisma harbour, the semi-detached house in Lucca, the small house in Padise and Nordic Hotel Forum in Tallinn.

Indrek Allmann is active in several countries and in addition to Estonia has designed buildings in Ukraine, Denmark, Latvia, Norway and Sweden.

== Social activities ==
Indrek Allmann has been a speaker at several international conferences, at the Estonian Academy of Arts and TalTech and been a member of the jury at various international architectural competitions, including for the buildings of the Estonian Academy of Arts and the Estonian Business School, the 2012 Latvian Building of the Year competition and the 2014 Lithuanian Building of the Year competition.

Indrek Allmann participated in the work of the supervisory board of Eesti Arhitektuurikeskus (Estonian Centre of Architecture) from 2014 to 2015 and the supervisory board for the architecture endowment of the Cultural Endowment of Estonia from 2013 to 2015. Indrek Allmann was a member of the supervisory board of Saarte Liinid AS from 2017 to 2020 and again as of 2020. Indrek Allmann is a volunteer maritime rescuer and is a member of the Muhu Merepääste Selts (Muhu Maritime Rescue Association).

== Selected works ==
- 1994 — Reconstruction project of a private residence, Tierp, Sweden
- 1997 — AS Trak Balti commercial building, Liimi 4a, Tallinn (with interior design; not built)
- 1998 — Hitehi varuosade AS office, Raua tn 16a, Tallinn (interior design)
- 1999 — reconstruction of the recovery department of Tallinn Järve Hospital, Energia tn 8, Tallinn
- 1999 — reconstruction of the hospital building of the Kose department of Kivimäe Hospital, Ravila mnt 27, Kose, Harju County
- 1999 — private residence "KloostriTagaMetsas", Padise Village, Padise rural municipality, Harju County
- 1999 — private residence "Oma pesa", Lucca 2e, Harku municipality, Harju County (with interior design)
- 2000 — Technical project for the comprehensive reconstruction of the Estonia theatre building, Estonia pst 4, Tallinn (with architect P. Jänes)
- 2001 — Top Vox and Alptom car centre, Ehitajate tee 116c, Tallinn
- 2001 — interior design for the Family Gate AG cooperative and head office, Fredericia, Denmark
- 2001 — modernised design solution of the shopping centre of Tartu Consumer Cooperative, Riia 2, Tartu
- 2001 — first construction stage of the church complex of Tartu St. Luke's UMC, Vallikraavi 16a, Tartu
- 2002 — Renovation of a maritime rescue building into a small residential building, Juminda village, Loksa rural municipality (with interior design); the first construction stage of the Harku small town centre (community centre and nursery school), Harku
- 2003 — Baptist church "Elim" church building and apartment building, Tistedal, Norway
- 2003 — hotel L’Ermitage, Toompuiestee 19, Tallinn
- 2003 — apartment buildings at Õie 2, Tallinn
- 2004 — Villa Ž at Lumiku street, Tallinn
- 2005 — Kauba Ekspress warehouse in Assaku
- 2005 — residential and commercial building at Kotzebue 27, Tallinn
- 2005 — Nordic Hotels hotel "Jekaba", Jekaba 24, Riga (with R. D. Smits)
- 2006 — Randvere nursery school, Viimsi Parish
- 2006 — apartment buildings in Veeriku quarter, Tartu (with Katrin Koit)
- 2006 — business and residential building at Turuplats square 1, Rakvere
- 2006 — business and residential building at Ujula street 2, Tartu
- 2007 — Eisma harbour, Eisma (interior design with M. Kurismaa)
- 2007 — Nordic Hotel Forum building in Tallinn
- 2008 — off-grid energy-plus building on Kesselaid
- 2009 — North Estonia Medical Centre X-block, Tallinn (co-architects Indrek Suigusaar and Ilmar Heinsoo)
- 2009 — surfing centre and conference hotel in Narva-Jõesuu (not built)
- 2009 — plan for a business and office building at Pärnu mnt 22, Tallinn
- 2010 — Hotel Marriott Renessance, Riga (with Joel Kopli) (not built)
- 2010 — residential and commercial building Kentmanni 6, Tallinn
- 2011 — Aidu rowing channel
- 2011 — revitalisation of Eesti Energia mining areas into a sports centre
- 2011 — Stroomi shopping centre, Madala street 5a / Tuulemaa street 20, Tallinn
- 2011 — Villa Laidoner on Õllepruuli street, reconstruction into a private residence, Tallinn
- 2012 — Veskimetsa equestrian centre, Paldiski mnt 135, Tallinn (not built)
- 2013 — Experimental and energy-efficient timber commercial building Novaator, Paldiski mnt 135, Tallinn (not built); Aidu rowing centre buildings, Aidu.
- 2014 — Residential and commercial building Poordi 1, Tallinn (with J. Jagomägi)
- 2015 — Buildings in the Lurich block in Ülemiste City, Tallinn; business district Elemental, Skanste, Riga; Rail Baltic Pärnu passenger terminal (with J. Jagomägi, T. Tammesson)
- 2019 — Haljala School, Haljala (with K. Krass)
- 2020 — Commercial building "Alma Tomingas", Sepise 7, Tallinn (with G. Kurusk); concept for Hundipea climate-neutral neighbourhood, Tallinn
- 2021 — Apartment buildings in Siili quarter, Tartu (with T. Tammesson); participation in the anniversary exhibition of the Estonian Museum of Architecture "The Houses That We Need" (with J. Jagomägi and G. Kurusk)

== Competition entries ==
- 2001 — Renovation competition for Tallinn 21st School (with S. Laanjärv and I. Suigusaar); Purchasing award Harku small town centre, 1st place; church complex of Tartu St. Luke's UMC 1st place
- 2002 — Hotel L’Ermitage at Toompuiestee 19, Tallinn; 1st place; shopping centre "Kalda Keskus" in Tartu; 2nd-3rd place
- 2003 — Apartment buildings at Õie 2, Tallinn; 1st place
- 2004 — Veeriku residential quarter, Tartu (with Katrin Koit); 1st place
- 2008 — church building for the "Valguse tee" free church, 1st place
- 2010 — reconstruction of the A-block of Rakvere Hospital, 3rd place
- 2010 — University of Tartu Institute of Physics; (with Joel Kopli) shared 1st place
- 2010 — Marriot Hotel Riga (with Joel Kopli), international architectural competition 1st place
- 2012 — Tallinn equestrian centre with surrounding commercial buildings (with I. Suigusaar and J. Jagomägi); 1st place
- 2014 — Residential and commercial building at Poordi 1, Tallinn; 1st place (with J. Jagomägi); Noblessner living quarter; international architectural competition; 1st place (with I. Suigusaar, J. Jagomägi, G. Kurusk, T. Tammesson, R. Kontus)
- 2015 — Rail Baltic Pärnu passenger terminal; international architectural competition; 1st place (with J. Jagomägi, T. Tammesson, Gunnar Kurusk and Holden Vides)
- 2017 — Kalaranna living quarter; international architectural competition; 2nd-3rd place (with I. Suigusaar, J. Jagomägi, R. Kontus, G. Kurusk, T. Tammesson)
- 2018 — Residential and commercial building "EpiCentre", Sepapaja 10, Tallinn; (with I. Suigusaar, J. Jagomägi) 1st place; Pärnu mnt 31, Tallinn 1st place
- 2019 — Haljala School (with K. Krass) 1st place; car park at Vabaduse pst 6, Tartu; (with J. Jagomägi) highlighted work; business building "Alma Tomingas", Sepise 7, Tallinn; (with G. Kurusk) international architectural contest; 1st place.

== Awards ==
- 2002 — "Steel building 2001" (buildings completed in 1998–2001)
- 2002 — Award nomination for the European Union Mies van der Rohe contemporary architecture award (private residence Oma Pesa, Tabasalu)
- 2003 — "Best Building of the Year 2002" in Tartu. Church complex of St. Luke's UMC.
- 2003 — "Best Estonian Wooden Building 1997-2003". Special award for the best use of cladding (private residence KloostriTagaMetsas, Padise)
- 2005 — "Best Estonian Wooden Building 2003-2005". Special award for the best use of laminated timber (apartment buildings at Õie 2, Tallinn)
- 2005 — "The Architectural Award 2005" Salon Press, Moscow, Russia. Finalist in category "Лучий зарубежный проект" (private residence KloostriTagaMetsas, Padise)
- 2005 — "The Architectural Award 2005" Salon Press, Moscow, Russia. Main award in category "Лучий зарубежный проект" (private residence Oma Pesa, Tabasalu)
- 2006 — "Architectural Object of the Year", ETV cultural show "OP!" (private residence KloostriTagaMetsas, Padise)
- 2007 — highlighted work for Estonian Association of Architects award "Väike 2002-2006" (awning of apartment buildings at Õie tn 2, Tallinn)
- 2007 — "Best Building for the Year 2006" in Tartu (Tulbi-Veeriku residential quarter, Tartu)
- 2011 — Finalist of the "World Architecture Festival", Barcelona (semi-autonomous sauna on an island)
- 2013 — "Wooden Building of the Year 2012". Award for the best façade solution. (Farmer's energy-plus building on Kesselaid)
- 2014 — Recognition by Tallinn Cultural Heritage Department "Best Restored Monuments". (Villa Laidoner, Õllepruuli tn 5, Tallinn)
- 2014/2015 — Estonian Association of Interior Architects award "Best Home Interior". (Eisma harbour building (with M. Kurismaa))
- 2017 — "Energy Deed of the Year". Off-grid residential building in Kesselaiu. Estonian Renewable Energy Association
- 2017 — "Wooden Building of the Year 2016". Highlighted by the jury (extension of the ant shed in Eisma harbour)
- 2019 — Award "SMALL 2018" for small objects from the Estonian Association of Architects (extension of the ant shed and small objects in Eisma)
- 2020 — Baltic Real Estate Award. "Best Urban Space Update" (Noblessner harbour)

== Notable publications ==
- 2001 — "Eramu – The Residence" EAL, Tallinn
- 2001 — "Vaba Eesti ehitab", Solnessi arhitektuurikirjastuse OÜ, Tallinn
- 2002 — Estonian brand style guide "Eesti Stiil – Estonia Style"
- 2004 — "The Phaidon Atlas of Contemporary World Architecture" Phaidon Press Ltd, London, Great Britain
- 2005 — "The Architectural Award 2005" Salon Press, Moscow, Russia
- 2005 — "ABSoluut Arhitectuur/Interieur 2" What If..., Ghent, Belgium
- 2006 — "Emerging Identities-East!" Deutsches Architektur Zentrum, Berlin, Germany
- 2006 — Alaprajz 2/2006, Hungary
- 2006 — "Innovative Wohnungsbauaspekte", Berlin, Germany
- 2007 — Deko 2/2007, Riga, Latvia
- 2007 — Deko 1/2007, Riga, Latvia
- 2007 — Но вый дом, Moscow, Russia
- 2007 — Arquitectura Viva Madrid, Spain
- 2008 — Boom/Ruum, Tallinn
