= Roza Eldarova =

Russian journalist (1923–2021)

- Роза Эдьдарова
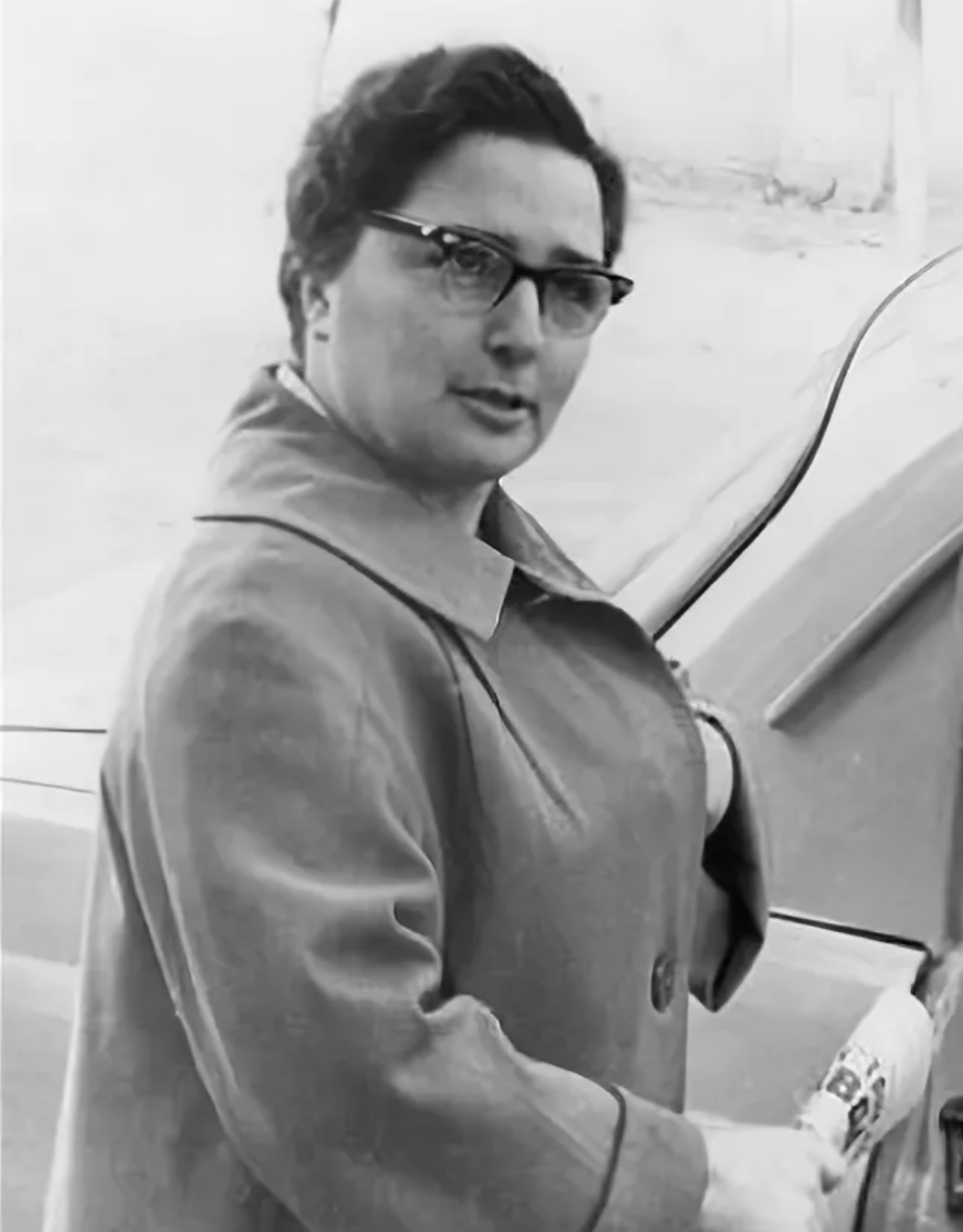
- Born: 21 December 1923; Kapchugai, USSR
- Died: 4 July 2021 (aged 97)
- Occupations: public figure, politician, journalist

Roza Abdulbasirovna Eldarova (Russian: Роза Абдулбасировна Эльдарова; 21 December 1923 – 4 July 2021) was a Soviet and Russian journalist of Kumyk ethnicity, writer, and politician who was the first woman to hold the highest political office in Dagestan. She was elected chairwoman of the Presidium of the Supreme Soviet of the Dagestan Autonomous Soviet Socialist Republic (DASSR) in March 1962.

Simultaneously elected to the Supreme Soviet of the RSFSR as a deputy for the DASSR, she became a member of the Presidium of the RSFSR Supreme Soviet in April 1962.

Eldarova retired from active involvement in politics in 1989 but continued to write. She published a memoir in 2008. Eldarova died on 4 July 2021 at the age of 97.

== Honours ==
- Order of Lenin
- Order of the October Revolution
- Twice Orders of the Red Banner of Labour
- Order of Friendship of Peoples
- Medal "For Labour Valour"
- Medal "For the Defence of the Caucasus"
- Medal "For Valiant Labour in the Great Patriotic War 1941–1945"
