= Turbasly =

Turbasly Турбаслы
- Selo
- Location within Bashkortostan Location within Russia
- Coordinates: 54°39′N 56°18′E
- Country: Russia
- Region: Bashkortostan
- District: Iglinsky District
- Time zone: UTC+5:00

Turbasly (Russian: Турбаслы; Bashkir: Турбаҫлы, Turbaślı) is a rural locality (a selo) and the administrative centre of Turbaslinsky Selsoviet, Iglinsky District, Bashkortostan, Russia. The population was 419 as of 2010. There are 9 streets. The selo is located close to the centre of Bashkortostan.

== Geography ==
Turbasly is located 34 km southwest of Iglino (the district's administrative centre) by road. Bibakhtino is the nearest rural locality.

== Tourist attractions ==
There are no tourist attractions in Turbasly.
