= W. Avery & Son =

English needle manufacturer

W. Avery & Son was a needle manufacturer during the Victorian Era from Headless Cross, a small village on the southwest side of Redditch, England. Redditch is located 15 miles south of Birmingham, the English city recognized as the centre of the Industrial Revolution. In the 19th century, the Redditch area produced the majority of the world's needles. W. Avery & Son is best known for their figural brass needle cases which were created by the company between 1868 and 1889. Since they produced the majority of these items, collectors refer to all brass needle cases manufactured during this time period as "Averys". Today, they are highly collectable and are usually sold on auction websites such as eBay or by antique dealers online, in shops or at antique shows. Most needle cases produced by the firm have W. Avery & Son Redditch engraved on the case as well as a design/patent registration stamp.

== Company history ==
From 1865 until 1899, the time period in which needle cases were created, the company was headed by William Avery (1832–1899). Earlier, from approximately 1832 until 1865, the firm was headed by William's father, John Avery (1807–1865). According to William's 1899 obituary, the company was founded in 1785. In addition the words "Established 1782" that appear on several pasteboard needle cases produced for W. Avery & Son in the late 1860s, 1870s and 1880s. Although no definitive data has been uncovered to prove when and by whom W. Avery & Son was established, it seems most likely that the firm was founded by William Avery (1758-1840), the grandfather of the creator of fancy brass needle cases. One of the earliest references to the company was found in Pigot & Cos 1828-1829 directory where it was listed as William Avery & Son, fish hook and needle manufacturer from Redditch.

The company was listed as a needle and fish hook manufacturer in many business and trade directories throughout the Victorian Period (1835, 1839 1842, 1850, 1855, 1861, 1865, 1870, 1872, 1875, 1876, 1878, 1879, 1879, 1879, 1892, 1896, 1896–97, and 1900). After William's death in 1899, his sons inherited the needle business which they subsequently sold to John English & Son Ltd, another needle manufacturer in the area.

== Brass Needle Cases ==
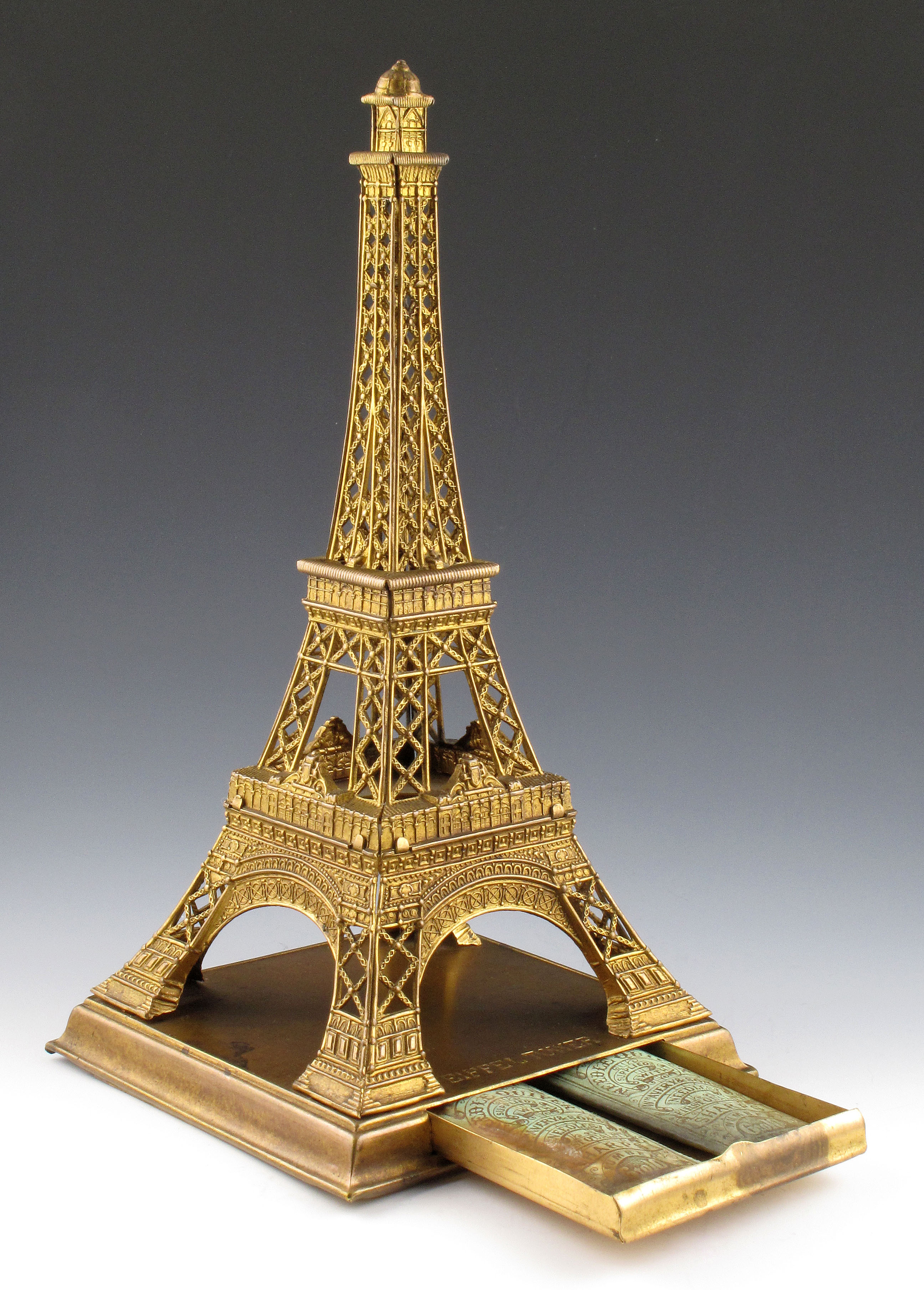
Eiffel Tower Needle Case

On 7 January 1868 W. Avery & Son patented their first brass needle case in Great Britain, #58, a flat single packet case named The Golden Needle Case. By November that same year, they patented the Quadruple Casket which contained slots for four different sized needle packets. Two years later in 1870, the Quadruple Casket and a Demi-Quad needle case were also patented in the United States. Within eight years the firm had created at least twenty-seven needle case designs, mostly figural, which were displayed at the London (1873), Vienna (1873) and Paris exhibitions. In 1875, the company was highly praised not only for their quality and workmanship, but also for the artistic appeal of their needle cases which were mentioned in exhibition reports sent to the Birmingham Chamber of Commerce. Several years later in 1878, W. Avery & Son appeared in an exhibition catalogue as needle and pin manufacturers and inventors from Headless Cross, and needle, pin and needle case manufacturers from 192 Great Hampton Row in Birmingham. By the time the Liverpool Exhibition opened in 1886, the firm had added at least 30 more designs to their repertoire, including a souvenir Quadruple Casket needle case with a drawing of the exhibition hall embossed on its exterior. During the Royal Jubilee Exhibition in Manchester in 1887 their booth was noted for another invention, a machine that could stick pins in rows of paper. A year later the firm won a gold medal for their participation in the 1888 World's Fair in Brussels. At the Exposition Universelle (1889) in Paris the W. Avery & Son booth displayed needles, pins and fancy pin and needle cases, as well as the machinery for sticking pins into paper. Also for sale in their booth that year was a new brass needle case in the shape of the Eiffel Tower, a miniature scale replica of the exhibition's main attraction, the architectural masterpiece of French structural engineer Gustave Eiffel.

== William Avery (1832-1899) ==
William Avery was born in 1832 in Feckenham, a civil parish in the Borough of Redditch in Worcestershire, England. He was baptized at St. Stephens, a branch of the Church of England, located in the centre of Redditch. He was the eldest son of John Avery (1807–1865), a needle maker/needle manufacturer from Headless Cross and Catherine Johnson (1806–1888). William had at least three brothers and a sister: Charles (1834–1911), Benjamin (1834–1846), Joseph (1839–1915) and Catherine (1842–1875). His two brothers that survived to adulthood were also employed in the needle industry.

William Avery married Maria Proctor Dingley in 1855 at the Wesleyan Methodist Chapel in Sherborne, Dorset. Shortly thereafter they returned to Headless Cross where they lived for the rest of their lives. They had four children: Helen Grace (1856-1860), William John (1859–1869), Benjamin Ricardo (1862–1947) and Charles Harold (1867–1943). In addition to creating needle cases, Mr. Avery wrote a book entitled "Old Redditch Being an Early History of the Town from 1800-1850". His youngest son, Charles, who wrote under the pseudonym, Harold Avery, was the author of over 50 children's books. After suffering from deafness and heart problems for many years, William died of heart disease in 1899 in Headless Cross at age 67. He died suddenly but peacefully while sitting in the garden at his residence. A special memorial service was held at the Wesleyan Church in Headless Cross on 17 September 1899, at which a 21-page pamphlet entitled "In Memoriam William Avery, J.P. of Headless Cross, Redditch," published by the local newspaper, was distributed. It sold at the service for three pence, for the benefit of the Unsectarian Benevolent Society of the Poor of Headless Cross which was founded by Mr. and Mrs. Avery in 1856.

Mr. Avery was well known in the Redditch area not only for his commercial success as the head of the W. Avery & Son firm but also for his philanthropy. Soon after his marriage, he and his wife established a fund for the poor of Headless Cross. Together they organized musical concerts which, because of his reputation as a musician, attracted large influential audiences which added to the organizations coffers. The Avery's also created a clothing club so they could literally "feed the hungry" and "cloth the naked". William helped to establish the Redditch Literary and Scientific Institute and the local School of Art. He served on the Feckenham district school board and was a staunch supporter of public elementary education. He delivered a series of lectures on Old Redditch to enthusiastic crowds which were eventually published in 1887 and continued to give lectures on a variety of topics. In politics he was a liberal. Later in life William was appointed as a Justice of the Peace for Worcestershire and sat for a short time on the bench at Redditch, however had to give it up due to his increased deafness. He was an active member of the Wesleyan Church where he played the organ for 50 years, taught Sunday school for 40 years and attended numerous Wesleyan meetings and conferences. He was a prominent citizen in all aspects of life in the area in which he lived.
