= Sewing machine needle =

Needle made for machine sewing

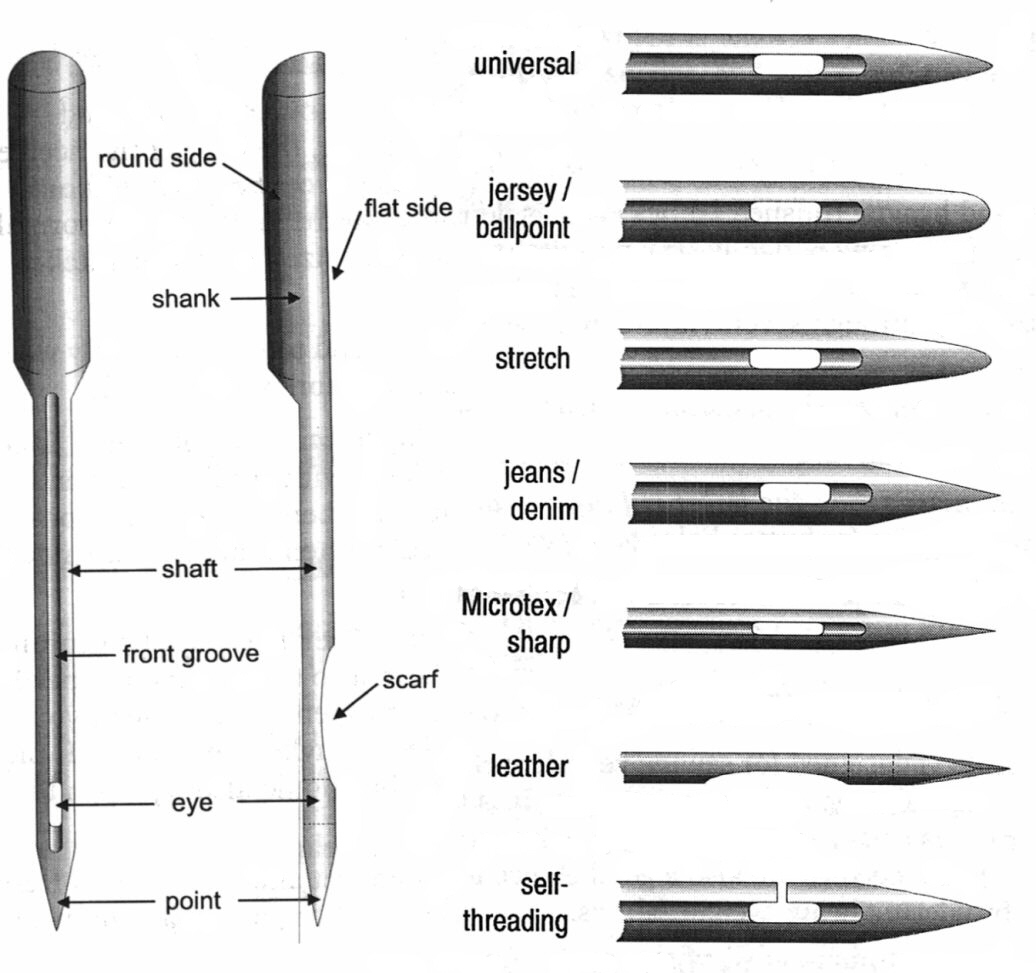
Parts of a sewing machine needle and comparison of several types of needle points and parts

A sewing machine needle is a specialized needle for use in a sewing machine. A sewing machine needle consists of:

- shank - clamped by the sewing machine's needle holder
- shoulder - where the thick shank tapers down to the shaft
- shaft - a length suitable for driving the eye and thread through the material and down to the bobbin
- groove - cut in the front of the shaft to allow the thread to lie more closely to the needle as it passes through the fabric
- scarf - provides extra room for the hook or shuttle to pass close by
- eye - carries the thread
- point - penetrates the material by either parting the threads or cutting a hole in the fabric

Domestic sewing machines, designed for use in homes as opposed to commercial sewing operations, use a common needle type (including a standardized length, as well as shank shape and diameter) referred to as "Groz-Beckert 130 / 705," "HAx1" or "15x1" needles. Needles labeled as "universal" needles are of this type and are generally the type of needles found in retail sewing supply shops. The 15x1 needle is available in different standardized shaft diameters suitable for sewing different fabrics (see the section on Size codes below).

For commercial/industrial sewing machines, there are several proprietary sizes and types of needles which are not mentioned in this article.

== Construction ==
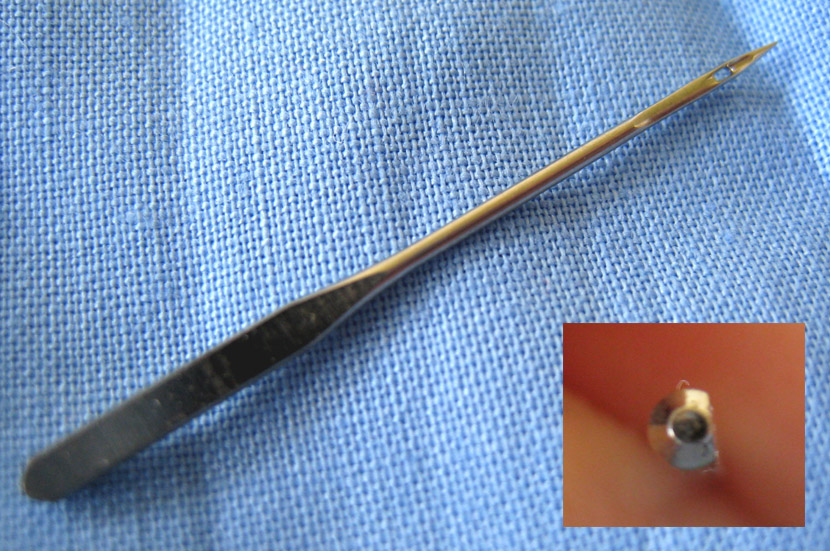
Universal needle design with a flat face

The majority of sewing machine needles are made of various grades of hardened steel coated with either nickel or chromium, though certain specialty needles are coated with titanium nitride on top of chromium. Titanium nitride is a reflective golden-colored ceramic material which reduces abrasion allowing the needle to stay sharper longer and last many times longer than other varieties. The titanium does not make the needle any stronger in regards to bending, however, and such needles will bend and snap just as easily as any other.

Nickel plating is the least expensive and least durable form of plating. Chrome plating lasts longer and gives better abrasion resistance. Titanium nitride on top of chromium is the most expensive and is superior in performance to both chrome and nickel.

== Size codes ==
More than a dozen modern conventions exist for numbering the sizes of sewing machine needles, though only two remain in common use: the American (established and propagated by Singer) and the international system (also called the "European", "number metric" or "NM" system). The European designation, established in 1942, corresponds to the diameter of the needle in hundredths of a millimeter at a non-reinforced point above the scarf. In both cases, a larger number corresponds to a larger, heavier needle.

Most sewing machine needles will have packaging that gives both of these numbers in its size description — (e.g. as either 100/16 or 16/100). The length of all sewing machine needles has been standardized and does not require a separate code.

The metric designation is the actual needle diameter in hundredths of a millimeter. The following chart gives a comparison of the two systems:

Universal needle shaft diameters
Diameter	American size	International size	Fabric types
0.60 mm (0.024 in)	8	60	Very fine fabrics (silk, chiffon, organza, voile, lace)
0.65 mm (0.026 in)	9	65	Very fine fabrics (silk, chiffon, organza, voile, lace)
0.70 mm (0.028 in)	10	70	Very fine fabrics (silk, chiffon, organza, voile, lace)
0.75 mm (0.030 in)	11	75	Light weight fabrics (cotton, heavier silks, synthetics, spandex, lycra)
0.80 mm (0.031 in)	12	80	Light weight fabrics (cotton, heavier silks, synthetics, spandex, lycra)
0.90 mm (0.035 in)	14	90	Medium weight fabrics (velvet, fine corduroy, linen, muslin, tricot, knits, fleece)
1.00 mm (0.039 in)	16	100	Heavy weight fabrics (denim, leather, canvas, suiting)
1.10 mm (0.043 in)	18	110	Very heavy weight fabrics (heavy denim, upholstery fabric, faux fur)
1.20 mm (0.047 in)	19	120	Very heavy weight fabrics (heavy denim, upholstery fabric, faux fur)
1.25 mm (0.049 in)	20	125	Extra heavy fabrics
1.30 mm (0.051 in)	21	130	Extra heavy fabrics

== Types ==
Most currently manufactured needles are designated according to "type", and fall into the following categories:

Type	Description
Universal	The universal class of needles are used on domestic machines. "Universal" refers to the shape of the needle shank and length of the needle rather than the actual sewing application or point. The most notable feature of universal needles is the flat face on the needle shank which helps to ensure the needle is inserted correctly. A universal class needle is designed to be used on virtually any domestic sewing machine. They do not fit industrial or commercial machines.
Embroidery	These needles come with an extra large eye and a specially shaped scarf to prevent embroidery thread from shredding.
Ballpoint	Also known as a jersey needle. Similar to a universal needle but has rounded edges and is not tapered the same way. Intended for closely knit fabrics where the rounded tip will push the weave out of the way rather than cut through it.
Jeans/ Denim	Intended for tightly woven cottons such as canvas. Has a strong, sharp point and very slender eye.
Wing	Needle has distinct "wings" on either side of the eye which hold the fabric open. Often used on hems and borders, and for decorative finishing. A larger size needle will leave a larger hole in the final piece of sewn fabric.
Leather	These have a distinct triangular point to help the needle make a large, clean hole in non-woven materials like vinyl.
Metallic	Similar to an embroidery needle with a large eye and extra long scarf, but also includes a Teflon coating to the eye so that metallic threads will not shred when used.
Quilting	Designed with an extra strong shaft and with a tapered point to penetrate multiple layers of woven fabrics without breaking and without shredding either the thread or the fabric being sewn.
Serger/ Industrial	These needles can only be used in serger and overlocking machines.
Microtex/ Sharps	More slender and sharper than the universal needle. Suitable for fine woven fabrics, but also compatible for quilting and appliqué.
Stretch	These needles are intended for use on fabrics with a significant amount of Spandex or similar fabric content. Rounded tip and specialized scarf and eye to prevent skipping.
Topstitching	These have exceptionally sharp points and a very large eye to accommodate thick decorative topstitching threads. Very similar to the leather needle.
Twin/ Triple	Needles set in pairs or in groups of three on a single shaft designed to sew multiple, usually decorative, threads at once. These require specialized machinery to accommodate the extra needles, as well as multiple thread feeds. The twin or triple designation is usually accompanied by another needle type specification such as "stretch" or "denim", etc.

== Singer number and color codes ==
Singer colors and numbers its needles with the following system of codes to indicate the needle point type and shaft size:

code and shank color	Point type
2000 - uncolored	chromium-coated regular point, for high-speed embroidery stitching
2020 - red	regular point, for woven fabrics (most common Singer needle type)
2022, 2053, 2054 - uncolored	overlock needles, only for overlocking machines
2044 - uncolored	embroidery needle
2045 - yellow	ball point, for knits
2026 - blue	heavy-duty point, for denims
2032 - brown	chisel or wedge point, for leathers
2025 - uncolored	twin needles
2040 - uncolored	hemstitch or wing-needle, for "heirloom" or decorative sewing, best on woven cottons and linens

Shoulder color	Shaft size (U.S.)	Shaft size (international)	Diameter
green	9 100	65	0.65 mm
orange	11	75	0.75 mm
blue	14	90	0.90 mm
purple	16	100	1.00 mm
silver	18	110	1.10 mm

== SVP Worldwide colour codes ==
The coloured band on some types of Inspira needles indicates the needle type.

Shoulder colour	Type
purple	Stretch
yellow	Microtex
red	Embroidery
blue	Denim
green	Quilting
uncolored	Others

== Kenmore color codes ==
Kenmore colors its needles with a different system of color codes which indicate the needle's size:

Shank color	Shaft size (U.S.)	Shaft size (international)	Diameter
blue	11	75	0.75 mm
orange	12	80	0.80 mm
red	14	90	0.90 mm
purple	16	100	1.00 mm
green	18	110	1.10 mm

== Schmetz shank colour codes ==
The coloured top band on some types of Schmetz needles indicates the needle shank types.

Top shoulder colour	Type
yellow	Stretch
lightgray	Super Stretch
blue	Jeans
orange	Jersey
green	Quilting
red	Embroidery
purple	Microtex
pink	Metallic
lt. green	Topstitch
brown	Leather
uncolored	Others

Schmetz needles with a universal needle (shank) have a colored bottom band indicating the (shaft) sizes:

Bottom shoulder colour	Shaft size (international)	Diameter
light cyan	60	0.60 mm
very light blue	65	0.65 mm
medium green-cyan	70	0.70 mm
strong pink	75	0.75 mm
red-orange	80	0.80 mm
strong cyan	90	0.90 mm
dark violet	100	1.00 mm
yellow	110	1.10 mm
brown	120	1.20 mm
black	125	1.25 mm
bright red	130	1.30 mm
