= Needle book =

Item for storing sewing needles

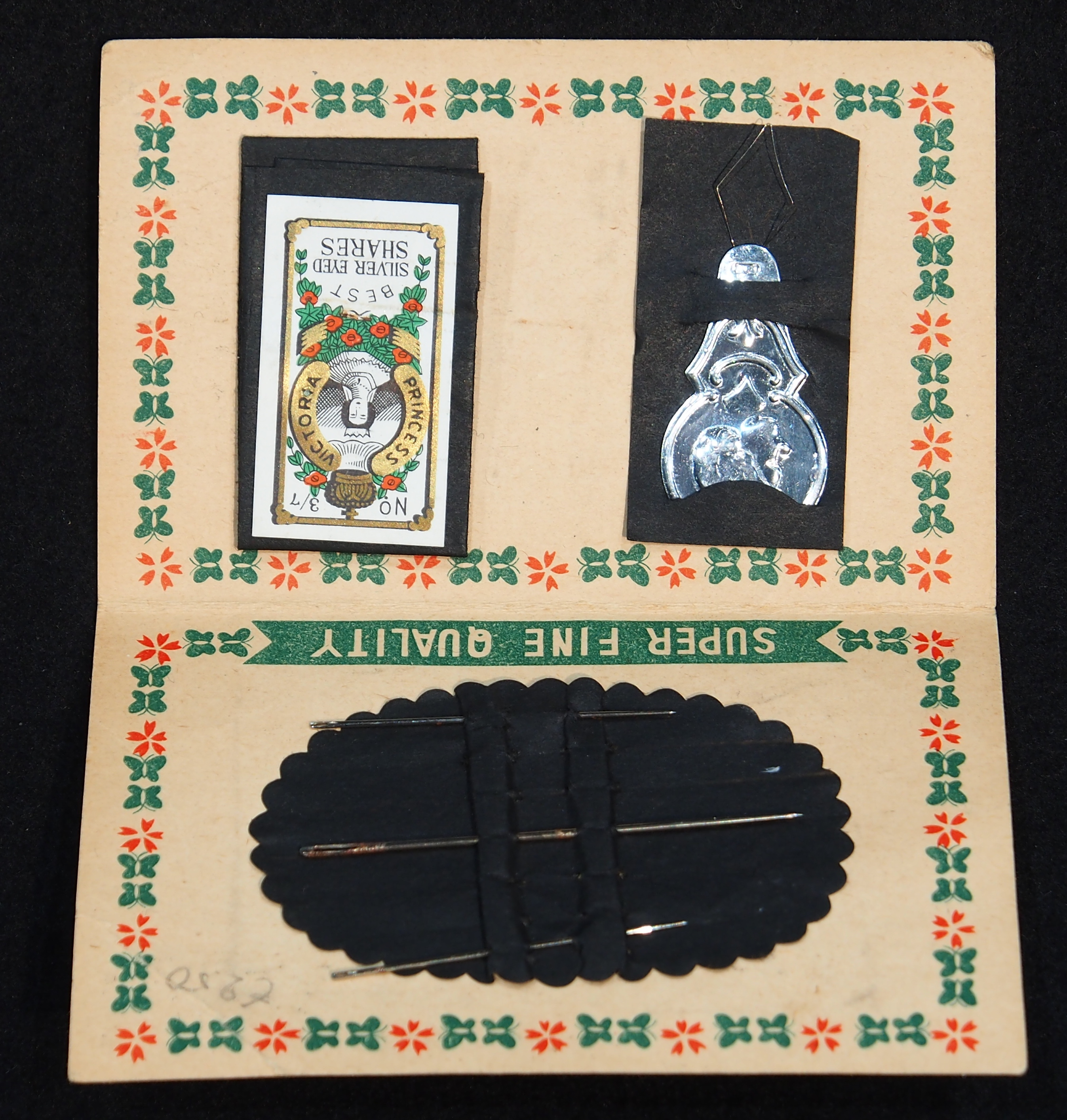
Needle book with butterfly design

A needle book is a small booklet designed to hold a variety of sewing needles. Needle books can be made of fabric, thick paper, leather, or other materials and contain pages of felt or flannel where needles can be stored safely. They may include decorative elements such as embroidery, decorative stitching, and closures like buttons or snaps.

== History ==
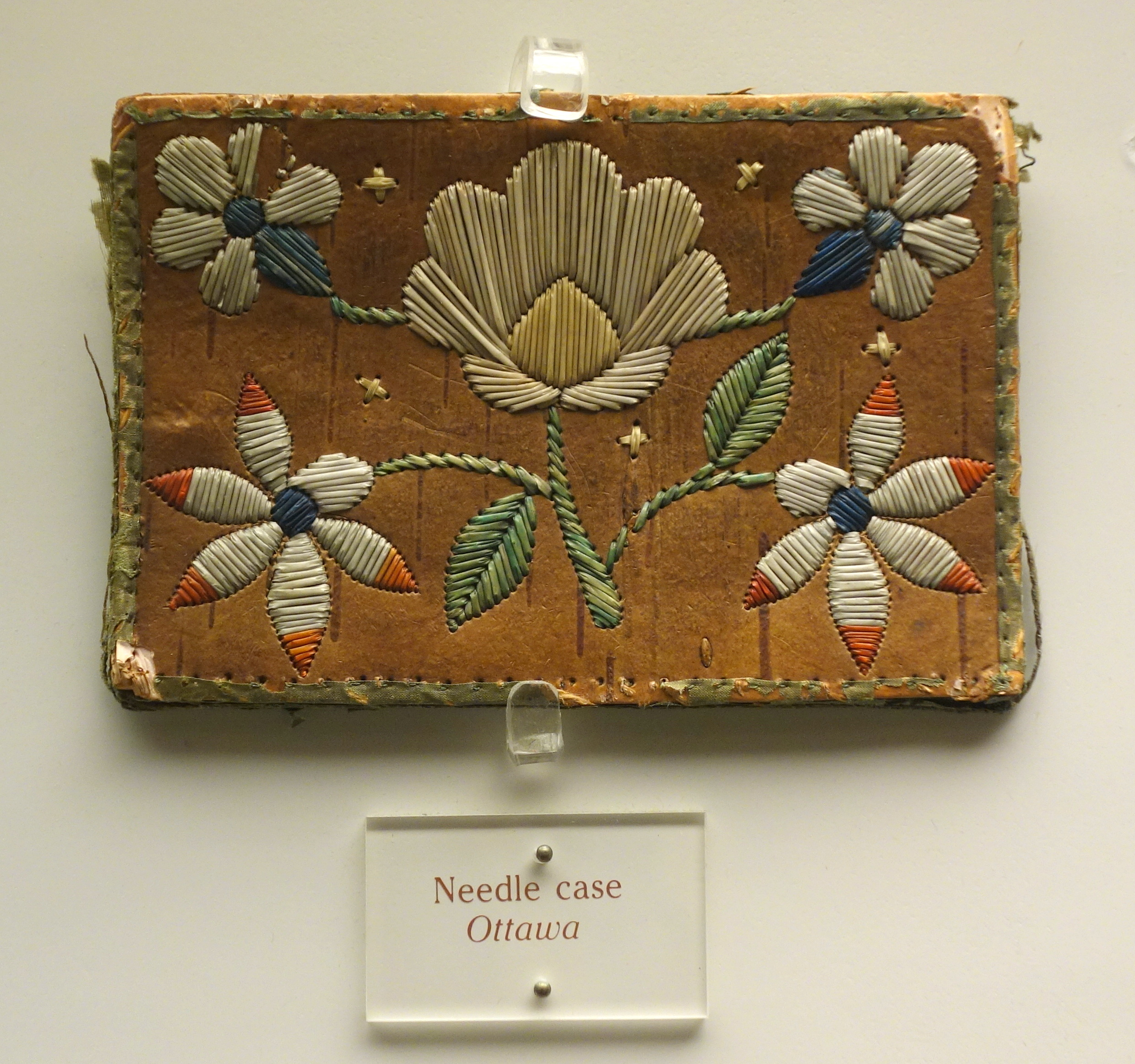
Historic needle case from the Wisconsin Historical Museum

Needle books became widely used during the 18th and 19th centuries as tools for storing and protecting sewing needles. They were frequently produced in Japan and Germany, and commonly included in household sewing kits and personal sewing supplies. Needle books could be made from a wide range of materials, from rough wool to delicate hand-painted silk, and were often given as gifts.

== Commercial needle books ==
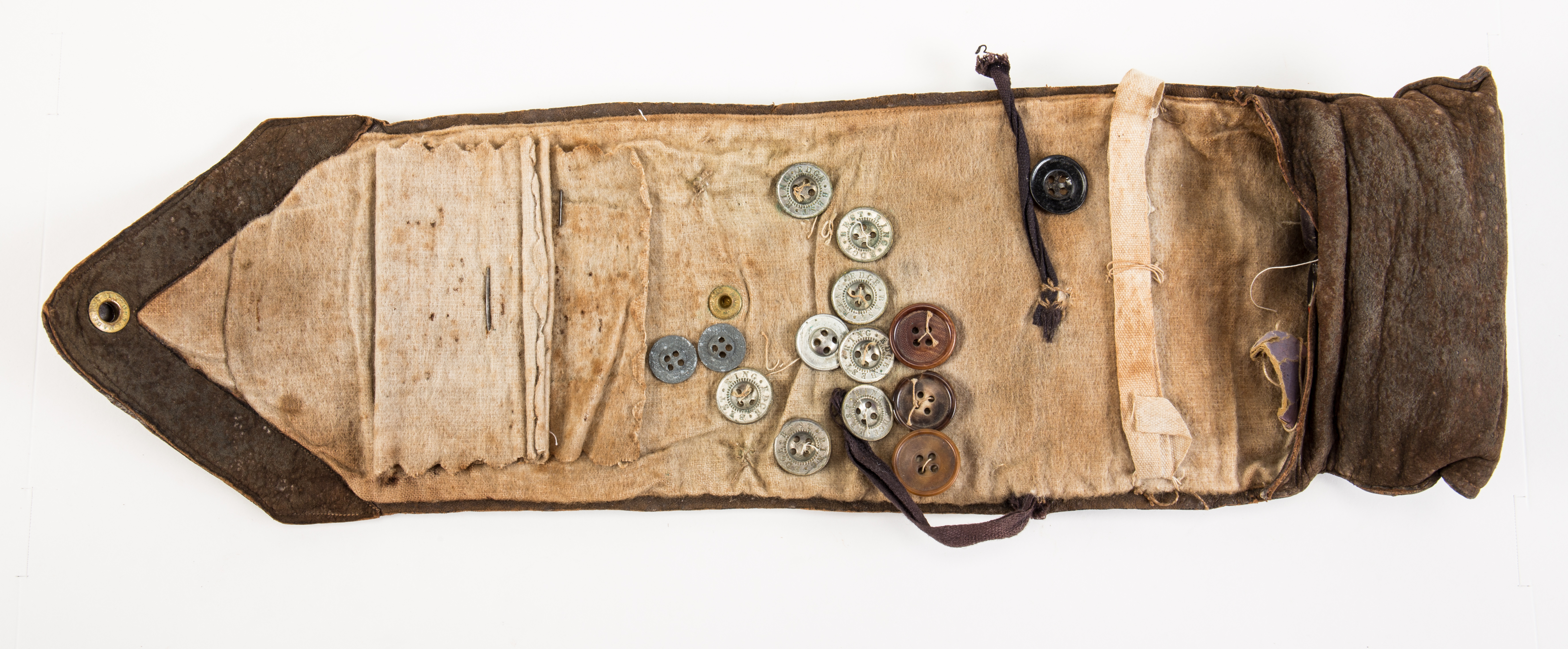
Example of a sewing kit containing needle storage

In the 19th century, needle books were sometimes used as advertising items. Needle manufacturers printed decorative paper needle books featuring business names, branding, and promotional messages. These promotional needle books were sometimes distributed to customers as advertising materials, similar to matchbooks.

== Cultural significance ==
Prior to industrial clothing production, hand sewing was a common household skill used to maintain and repair garments. Needle books were in widespread use, including use by military personnel. The books were often designed to appeal to particular audiences, such as battleship decorations on the cover for sailors, or images of women and girls for the domestic market.

Today, antique needle books are preserved in museum collections and are considered historical sewing tools and collectible artifacts.
