= Needle threader =

Device to put thread through a needle

Needle threader and usage with a needle.

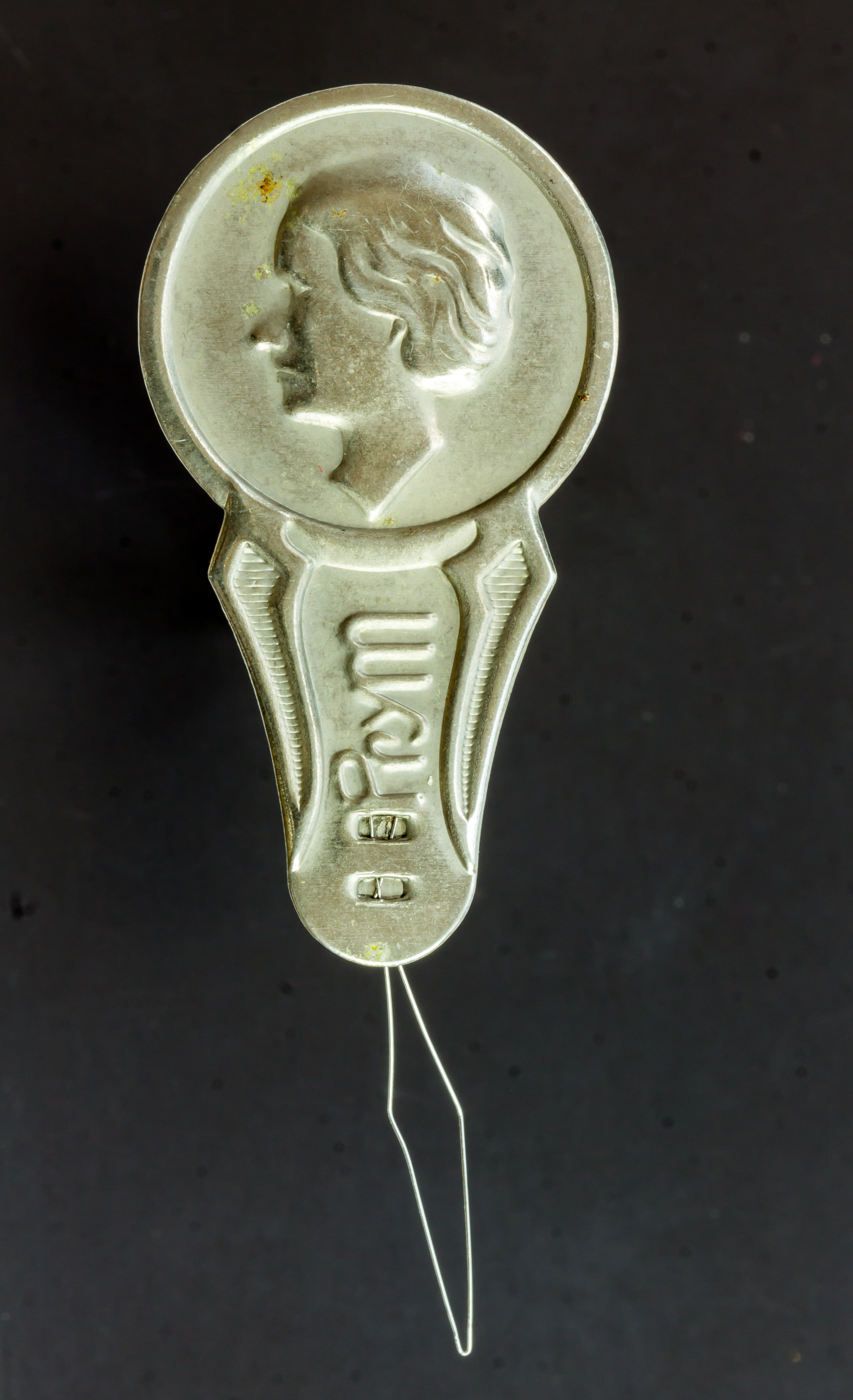
Typical needle threader.

A needle threader is a device for helping to put thread through the eye of a needle. Many kinds exist, though a common type combines a short length of fine wire bent into a diamond shape, with one corner held by a piece of tinplate or plastic.

The user passes the wire loop through the needle eye, passes the string through the wire loop and, finally, pulls the wire loop, back, through the needle by the handle, which pulls the thread through at the same time. The typical needle threader of this type has the image of a woman, possibly, Arachne or Minerva in profile stamped into the plate handle.

Another type of needle threader is mechanically operated. These may be part of a sewing or embroidery machine, or standalone tools.

The first known use of needle threaders in Europe was in the eighteenth or early nineteenth century.

== See also ==
- Sewing needle
- Thimble
- Treen (wooden)
