= Needlecase =

Container for sewing needles

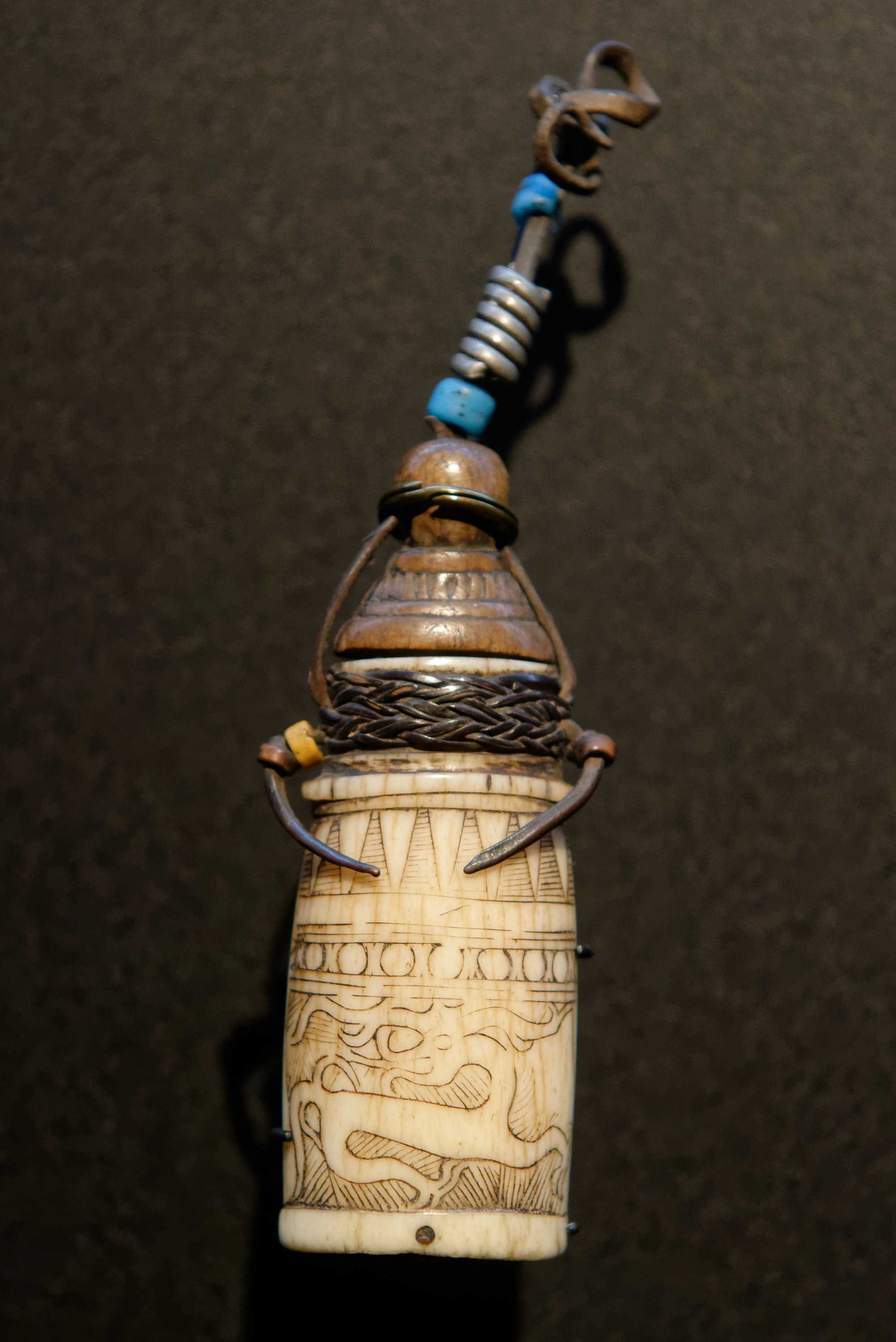
19th-century needlecase of bone, lead, wood, glass pearls, amber, leather, bronze, and iron. Nivkh or Evenki people, Amur River basin, Russia.

A needlecase or needle case is a small, often decorative, holder for sewing needles. Early needlecases were usually small tubular containers of bone, wood, or bronze with tight-fitting stoppers, often designed to hang from a belt. Needlecases are often components of an étui and are typically one of the tools attached to a chatelaine.A pin poppet is a similar container for pins, common in the 18th century. Bodkin cases, made for larger, thicker bodkin needles, were made in the 18th and early 19th centuries.

== History ==
Early sewing needles were precious items and easily lost. Needlecases were a necessity for storing these fragile objects, and are found in cultures around the world. Tubular bronze needlecases are common finds from Viking-age sites in Europe. Cane needlecases were found in a grave from Cerro Azul, Peru, dated to 1000–1470 AD. Bone, leather and metal needlecases have been found from Medieval London, and bone or ivory needlecases were made by Inuit. Bone and ivory needlecases and pin poppets were also popular in 18th century America.

Some medieval needlecases were suspended from a cord attached to a girdle that encircled the waist. These effective but basic needlecases were composed of something soft that was sewn to the cord to hold the needles, and a short hollow piece of wood or bone covered this It could be raised as needed to retrieve a needle.

During the Tudor period in England, needlecases began to be fashioned as needlebooks, but by the early 18th century, cylindrical cases replaced the books that allowed moisture to rust the needles. These needlecases were made of many materials, but had in common their length (3 inches up to 5 inches) and the fact that the top and bottom screwed together. Some are extremely finely made.

Elaborate needlework confections like the frog-shaped needlecase in the Los Angeles County Museum of Art appeared by the 16th century. These expensive needlecases, usually made out of a precious metal, were designed to be "a thing of joy," as well as a practical item. The Eiffel Tower needlecase shown in the gallery is another example of such a delight.

Unusual needlecases found in the Netherlands include ones that have the family crest at one end or the other, in order to be used as a seal. More rare is one that has two different seals at either end of the needlecase. These needlecases featuring seals were popular in the 18th and first half of the 19th centuries. A late 18th century Dutch needlecase takes the form of a thimble house--there is a separate cylinder at the top for a thimble.

Heavily decorated silver and brass needlecases are typical of the Victorian period. Between 1869 and 1887, W. Avery & Son, an English needle manufactory, produced a series of figural brass needlecases, which are now highly collectible. Avery's dominance of this market was such that all similar brass Victorian needlecases are called "Averys".

One style of needlecase was inspired by a French breech-loading machine gun, the mitrailleuse. It could discharge bullets from its multiple barrels all at once or rapidly one after another. The needlecase style bearing this name was a cylinder divided in compartments, each of which contained numerous needles of the same size. A revolving cap would allow the selected size compartment to open and discharge needles. Sears, Roebuck and Co. and other firms sold these needlecases inexpensively.

== Gallery ==
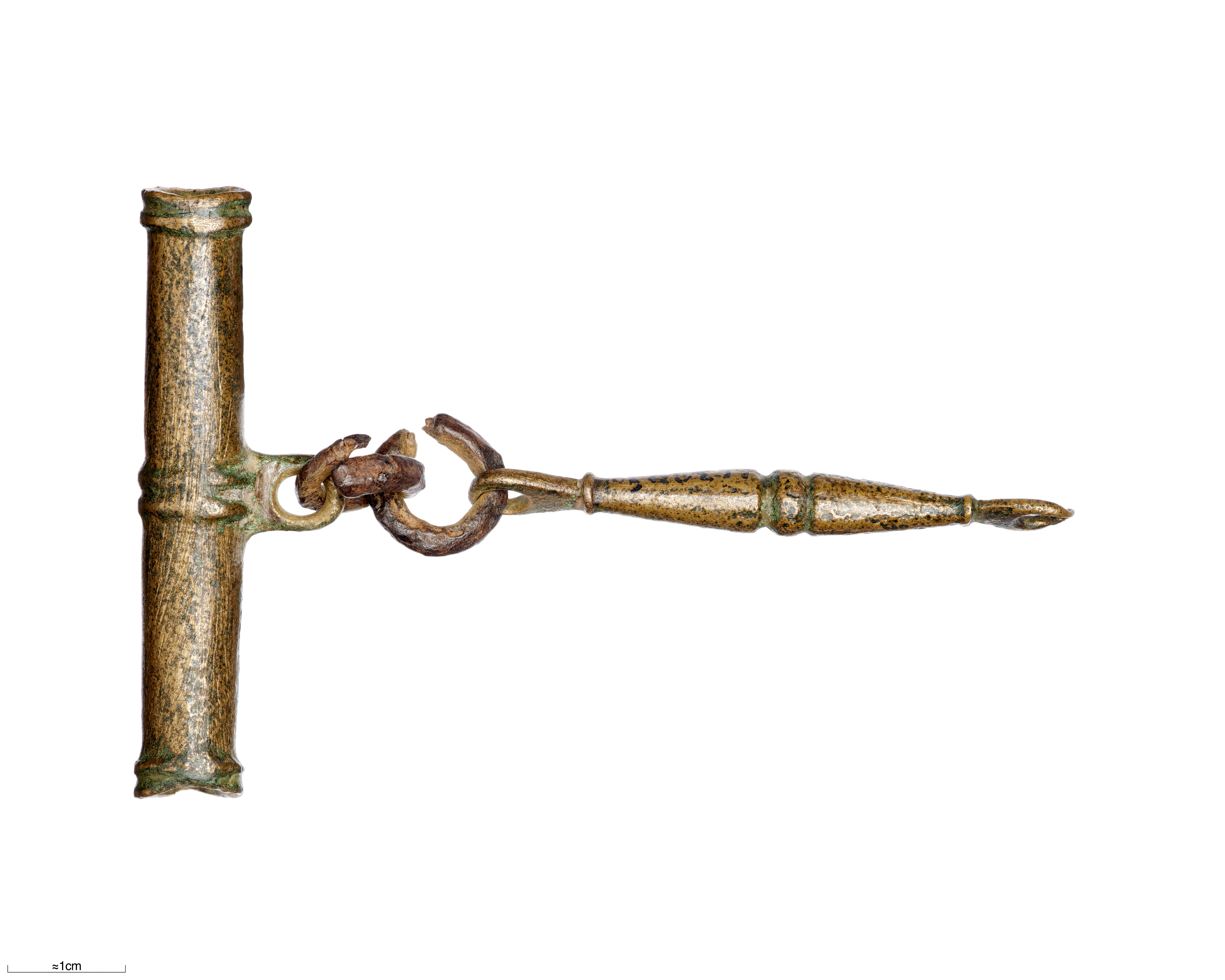
Viking age bronze needlecase from Gotland, Sweden

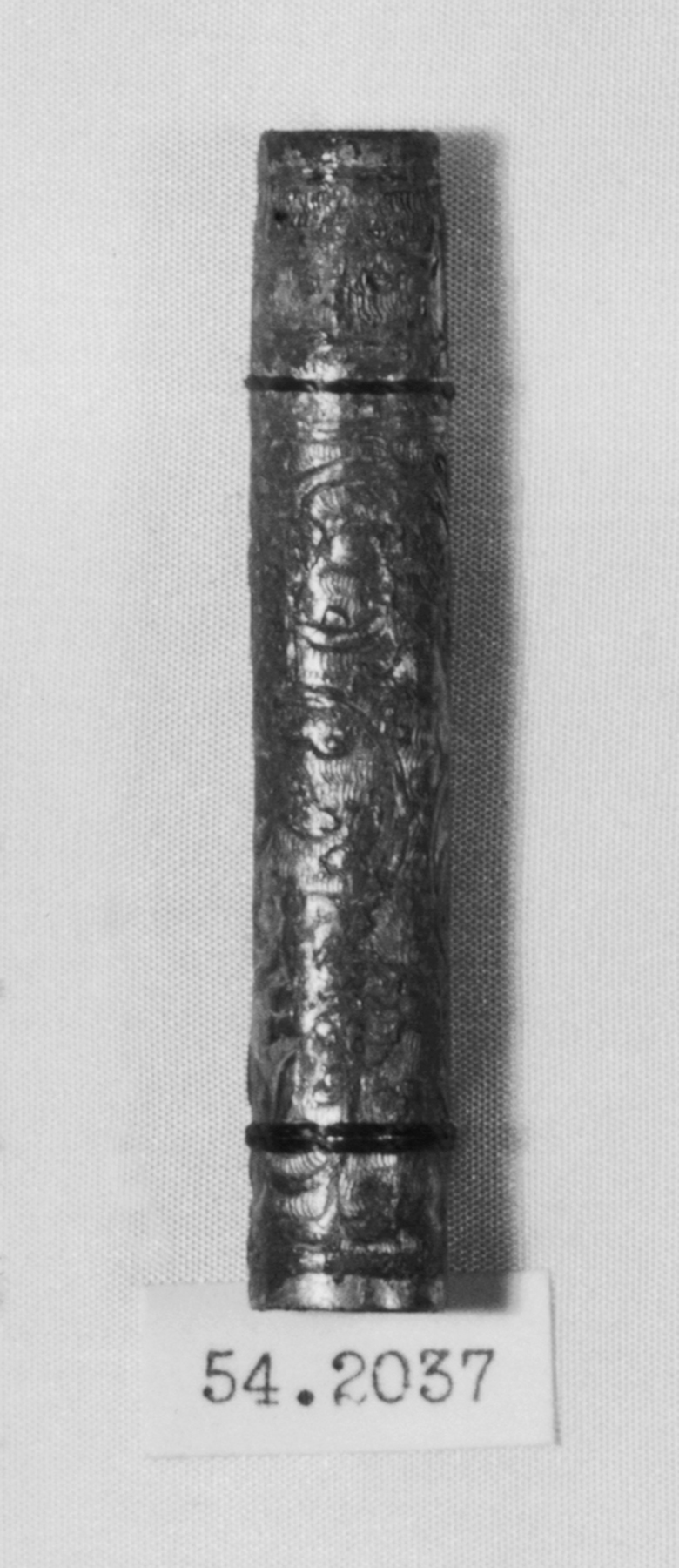
Gilt bronze needlecase, 10th century (Goryeo period), Korea

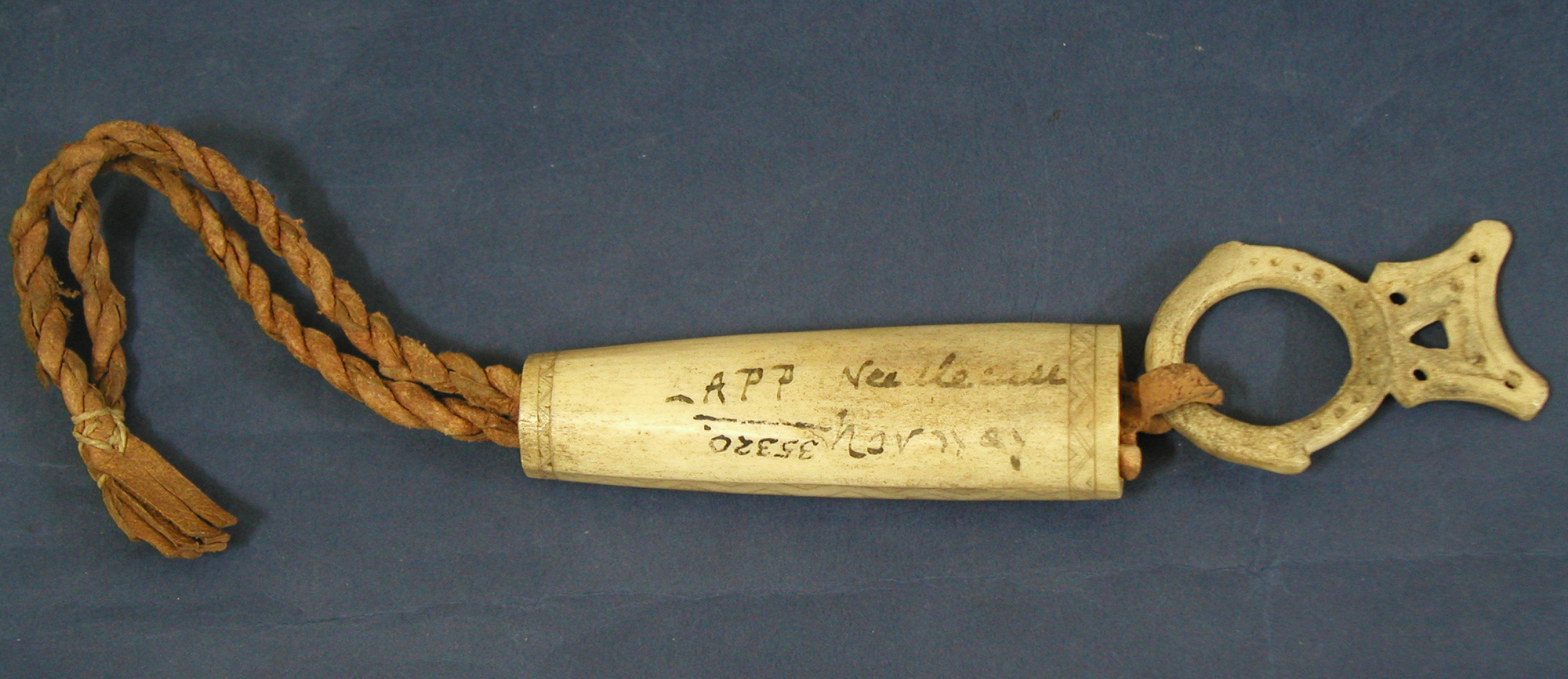
Needle carrier with bone cover suspended from a cord, Collection of Auckland Museum Tamaki Paenga Hira, undated

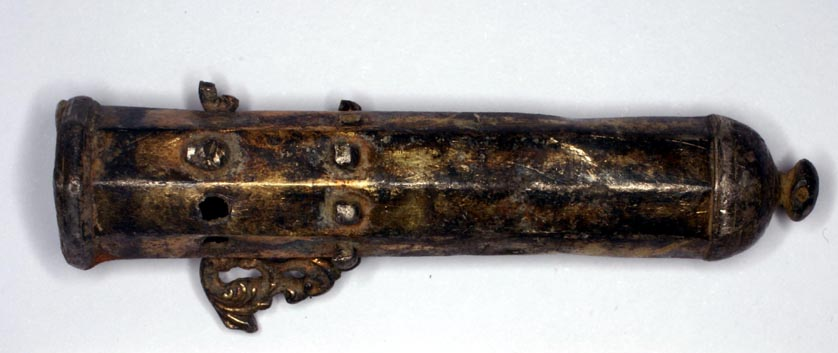
Damaged silver needlecase, 1500–1550, found in Dorset, UK

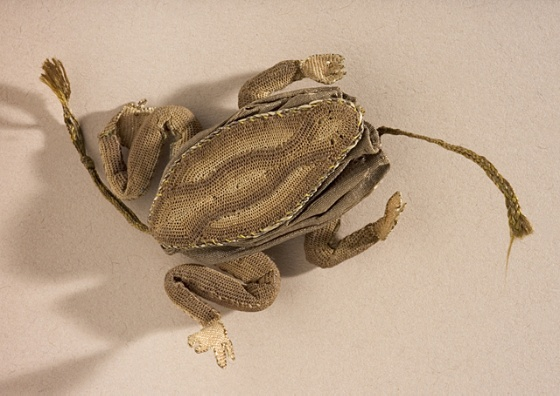
Embroidered frog-shaped needlecase, early 17th century, England

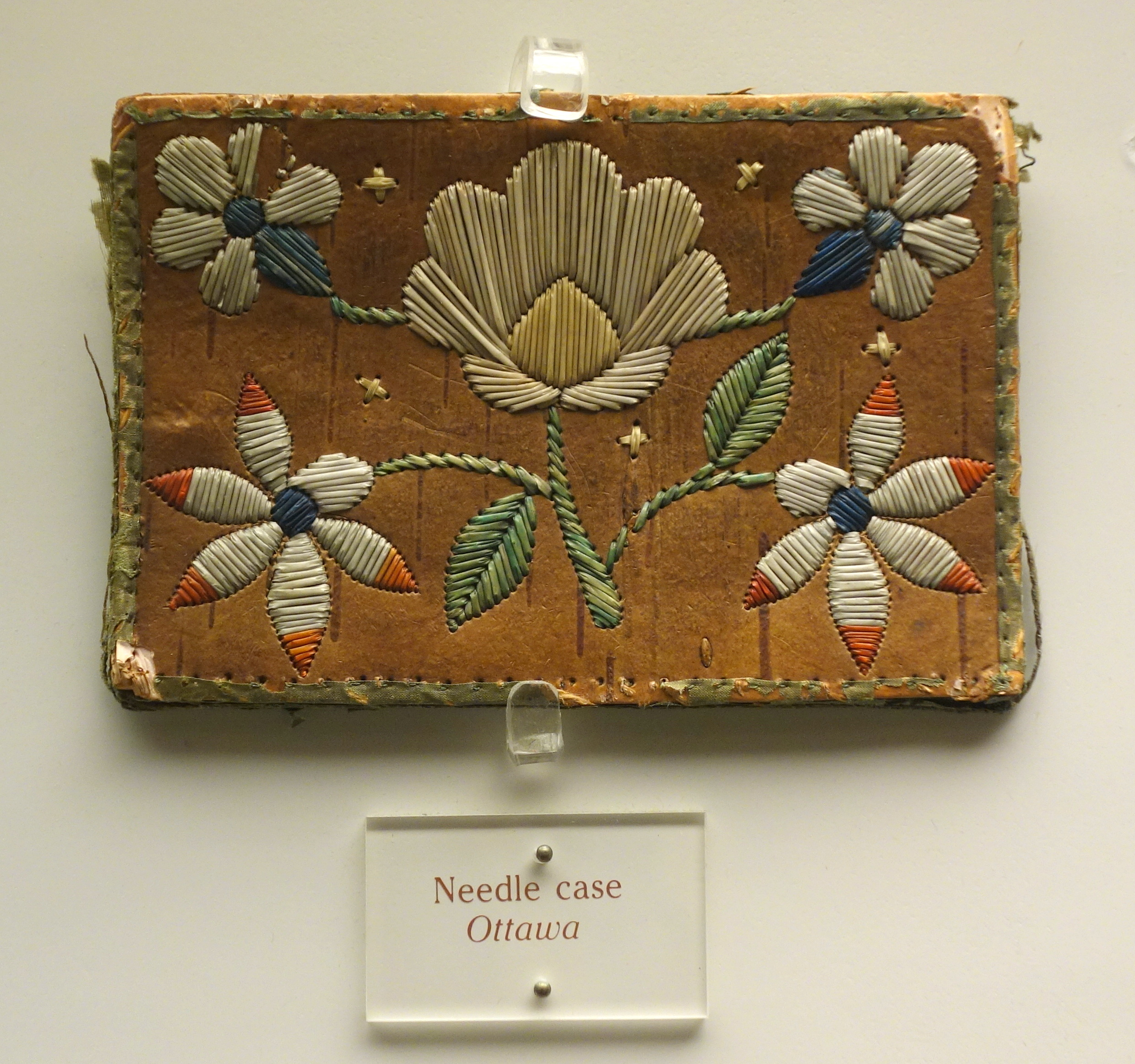
Needlecase, Odawa, undated

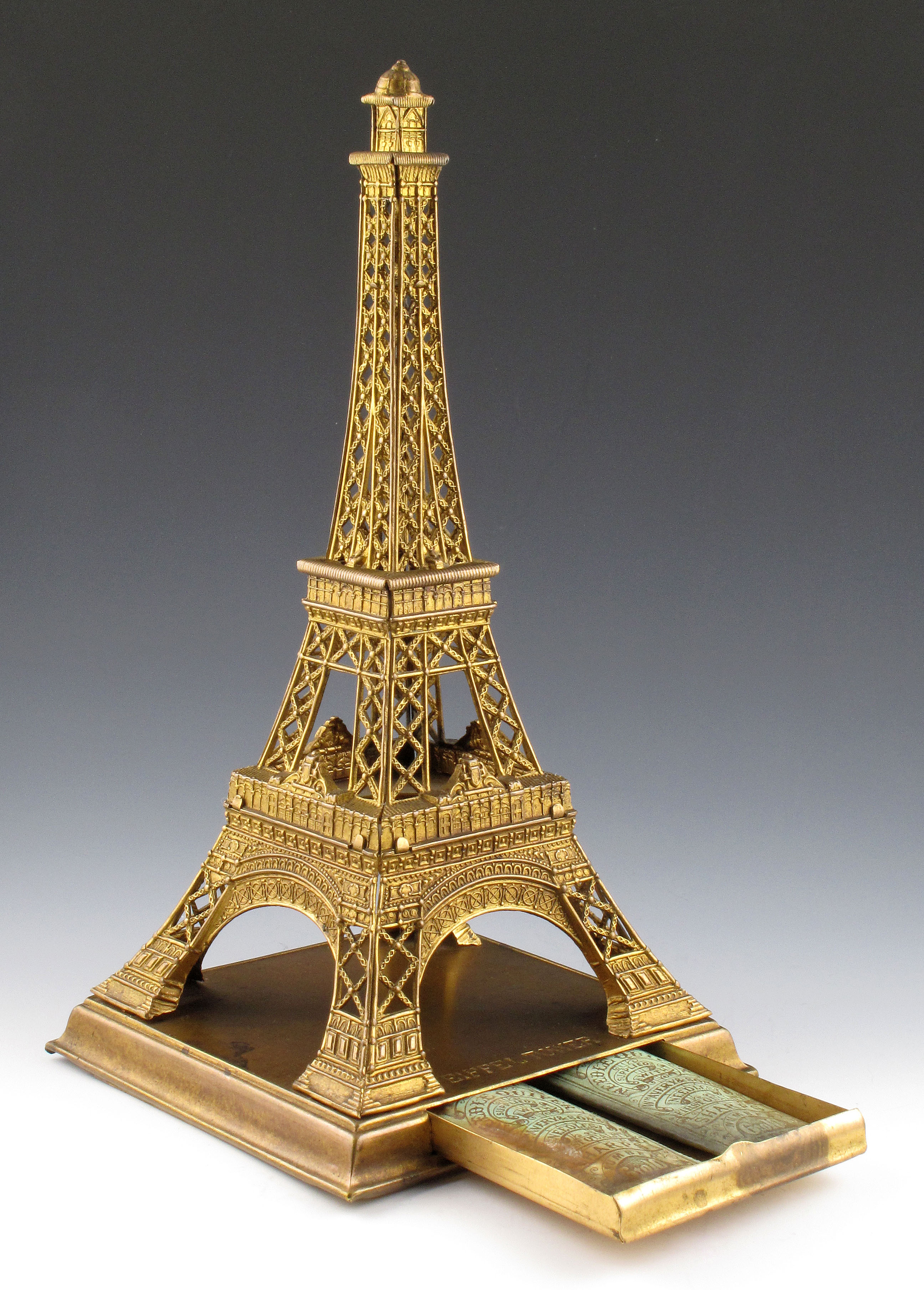
Eiffel Tower needle case, W. Avery & Sons, England, 19th century

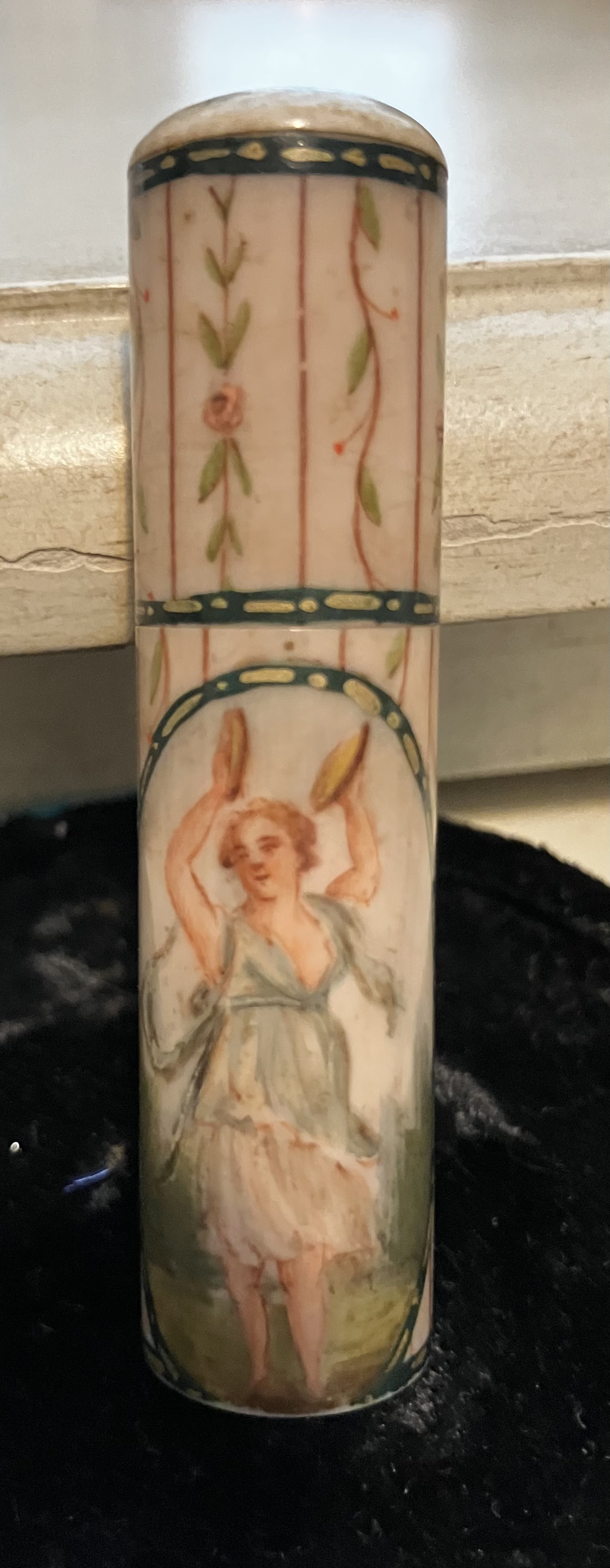
Painted British Porcelain Bodkin Case, circa 1820

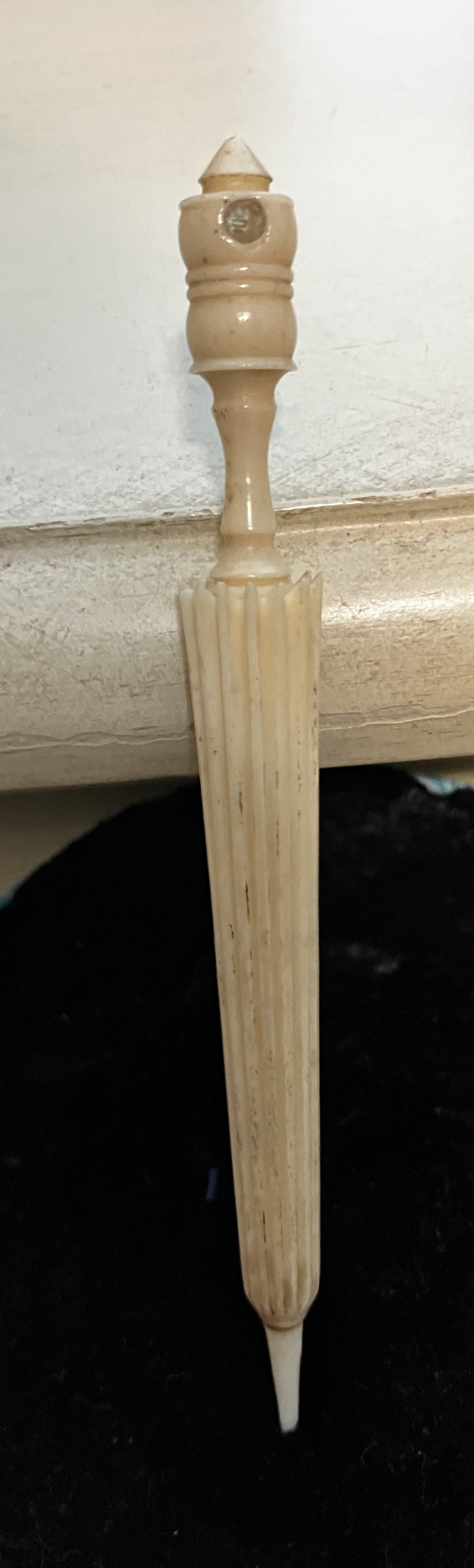
Bone needlecase with Stanhope in the shape of a furled umbrella, late 19th century

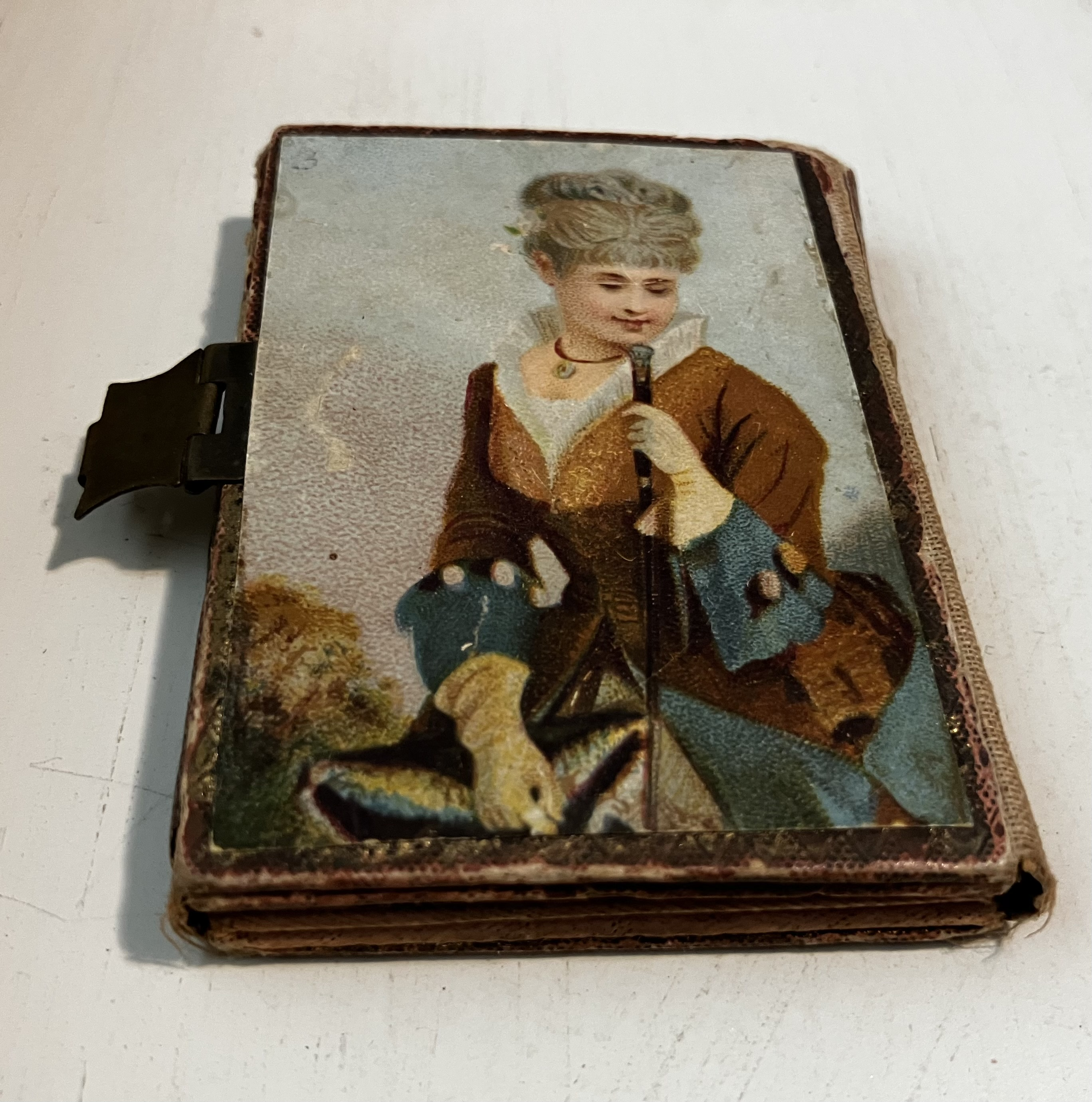
Mid-19th century folding needle book with 2 packets of R J Roberts needles inside

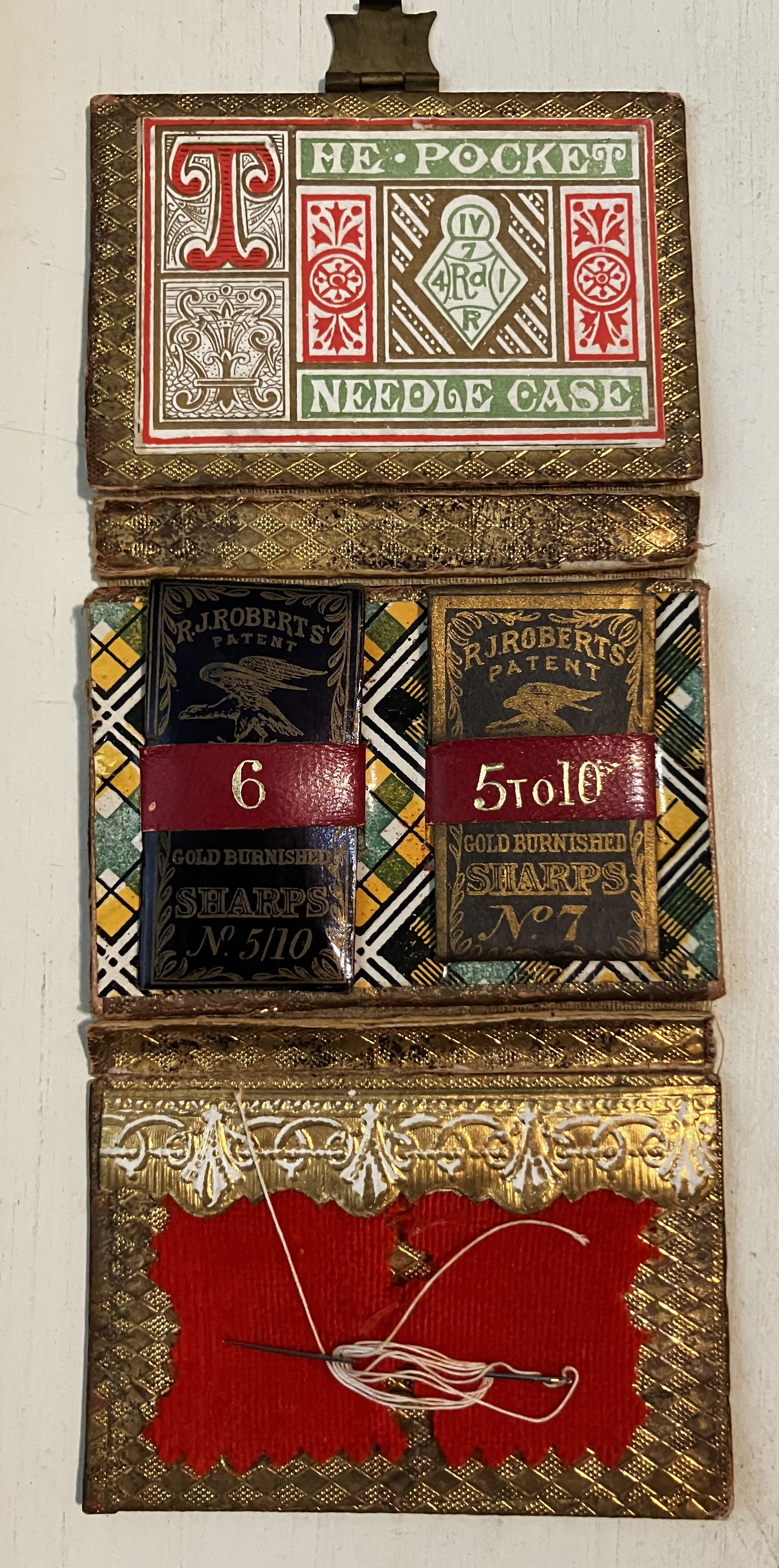
The Pocket Needle Case includes several beading needles, a pin cushion, and two boxes of R.J. Roberts needles, 19th century

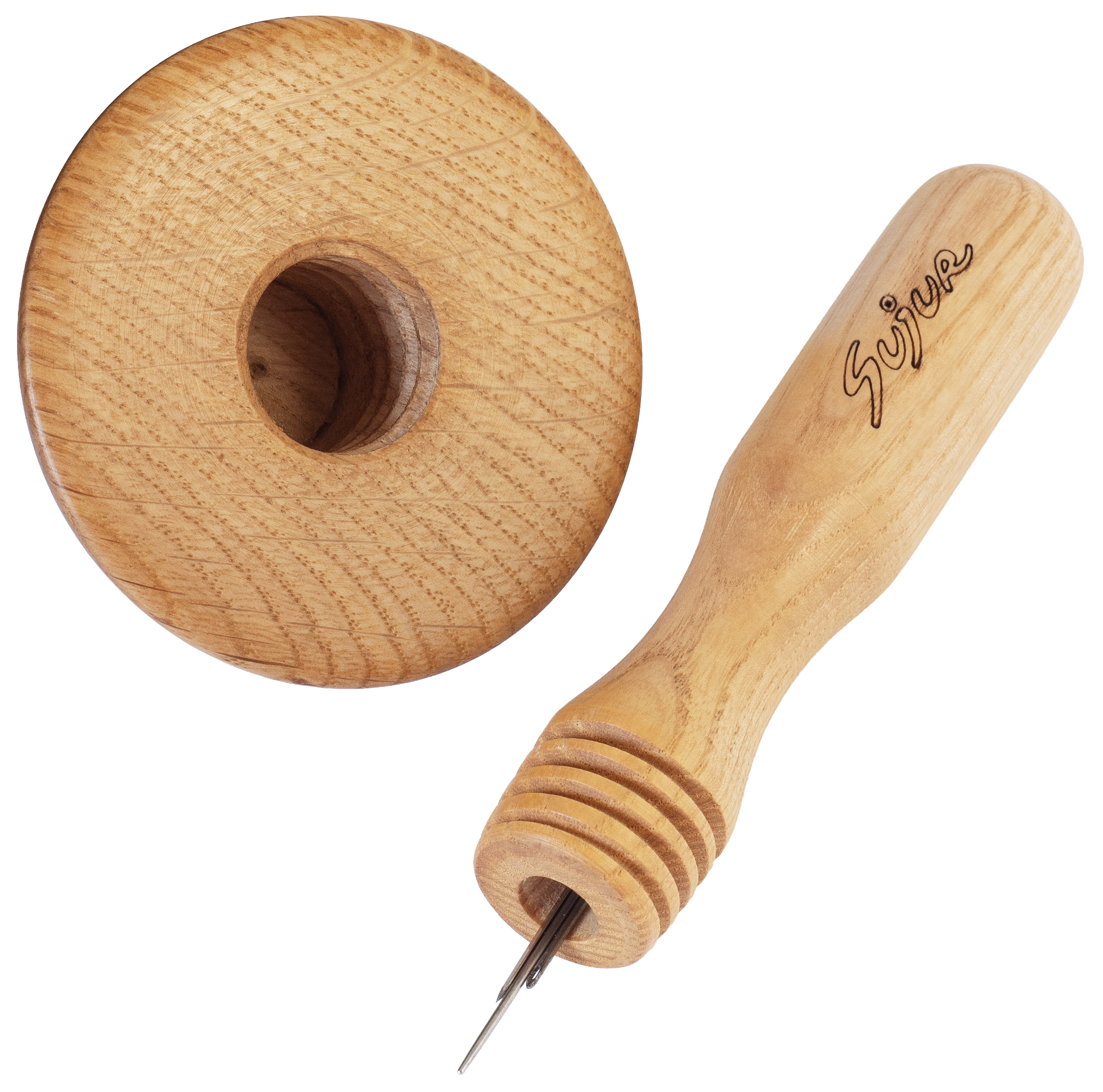
A contemporary darning mushroom with a built-in screw-on needlecase for darning needles
