= Hari-Kuyō =

Japanese Buddhist and Shinto Festival of broken sewing needles

Hari-Kuyō (Japanese: 針供養) is the Japanese Buddhist and Shinto Festival of broken sewing needles, celebrated on February 8 in the Kantō region, but on December 8 in the Kyoto Prefecture and Kansai region. It is celebrated by women in Japan as a memorial to all the sewing needles broken in their service during the past year, and as an opportunity to pray for improved skills. It is also called the Needle Mass and Pin Festival. "Hari" means "needle" and the suffix "-kuyo" means "memorial", derived from a Sanskrit word pūjā or pūjanā, meaning "to bring offerings".

== History ==
Hari-Kuyō began four hundred years ago as a way for housekeepers and professional needle-workers to acknowledge their work over the past years and respect their tools. In the animist traditions, items as well as humans, animals, plants, and objects are considered to have souls. This festival acknowledged the good given to people by their tools. Practitioners went to Shinto shrines and Buddhist temples to thank their broken needles for their help and service. This is in keeping with the philosophy of "not wasting" or "paying honor to the small things" exemplified in the concept of mottainai.

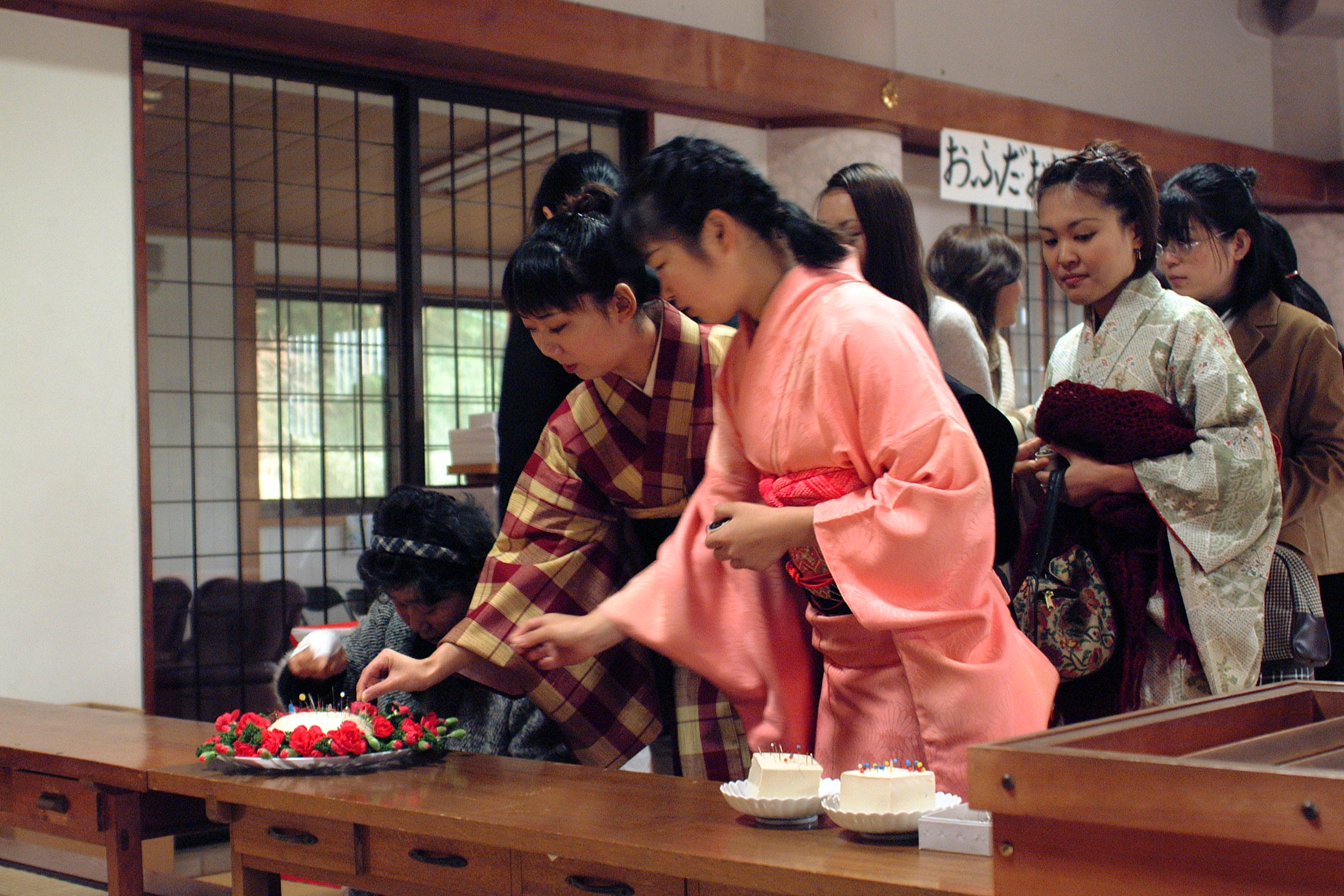
A ceremony at the Awashima Shrine

== Modern practice ==
Festival-goers gather at shrines and temples, bringing their broken needles and pins. In a funereal atmosphere, the implements are laid to rest in tofu or konnyaku (soft jelly cakes) in a spirit of tenderness and gratitude.

"A small three-step altar is set up and hung with a sacred rope and strips of cut white paper which indicate a sanctified area. On the top step are offerings of fruit and sweet cakes. On the middle step is a cake of tofu and on the bottom step are various sewing accessories.

On this day, the seamstresses take a holiday and bring their old needles to the temple to stick them in a piece of tofu or konnyaku. Threads of the five Buddhist colors were used with the needles."

== Sources ==
- Asai, Hiro. "Needle mass: Hari-kuyo" Beauty of Kimono in New York at https://web.archive.org/web/20140221184439/http://blog1.kimonohiro.com/2009/02/needle-mass-hari-kuyo.html accessed on February 8, 2014.
- Bates, Debbie. "Hari-kuyo: Festival of Broken Needles," Stitchtress.com at https://web.archive.org/web/20140225201850/http://stitchtress.com/2010/02/08/hari-kuyo/ accessed on February 8, 2014.
- Boyd, David, ed. "Hari-kuyo." The Japan Foundation at http://www.jpf.org.au/onlinearticles/hitokuchimemo/issue7.html accessed on February 9, 2015.
- Greve, Gabi. "Saijiki for Festivals and Ceremonies" at https://wkdfestivalsaijiki.blogspot.com/2011/01/needle-ceremonies-hari-kuyo.html accessed on February 9, 2014.
- Japan Times. "Festivals in Japan" at http://www.japantimes.co.jp/events/festival-listings/ accessed on February 9, 2014.
- Kretschmer, Angelika. "Mortuary Rites for Inanimate Objects: The Case for Hari Kuyō", Japanese Journal of Religious Studies Vol. 27, No. 3/4, Mortuary Rites in Japan (Fall, 2000), 379-404.
