= Harold Avery =

English author of children's literature

Avery's books often contained illustrations such as this one, from his book Frank's First Term, published in 1896.

Harold Avery (13 April 1867 – 25 September 1943) was an English author of children's literature.

== Biography ==
Charles Harold Avery was born on 13 April 1867 in Headless Cross/Feckenham near Redditch, Worcestershire, England. He was the son of William Avery (1832–1899), a needle manufacturer from Headless Cross/Redditch. His father was the owner of the W. Avery & Son company, which made needles, pins and needle cases during the second half of the nineteenth century. His mother was Marie Proctor Dingley (1832–1895), originally of Sherbourne, Dorset. Charles had one sibling, an older brother named Benjamin Ricardo Avery (1862–1947). Charles attended school at Compton Place Road New College in Eastbourne, Sussex and when his studies were completed, went to work for his father in Headless Cross as a needle manufacturer assistant.

Charles married Winifred Allen (1869–1938), the daughter of a Wesleyan minister in Launceston, Cornwall on 26 April 1898. How they met is unknown, however, his parents were active members of the Wesleyan church and his mother had visited West Looe in Cornwall in 1891. On his marriage certificate, Charles is listed as an author who was living at Bridgegrove Villas in St. Stephens by Launceston at the time of his marriage. In 1899 when his father died, Charles inherited half of his father's estate which passed to the two brothers in equal shares on 29 September 1899. Charles and Benjamin where listed as gentlemen in the sale documents when the property was sold to another needle manufacturer J. English & Son in September 1900. Charles' residence on these documents was listed as Belmont Villa in Boscastle, Cornwall. By 1901 the couple had moved to or was visiting South Hammersmith in London where they were boarders in a house they shared with his brother Benjamin. By 1907 Charles and Winifred were living at Wyndcliffe on Hornyold Road in Malvern, Worcestershire. Their only child, a son they named William Harold Avery, was born there on 10 October 1907. In 1911 Charles was living with his brother in Eastbourne, Sussex while Winifred and their three-year-old child, William, were living with or visiting her sisters and brother in Launceston.

Winifred died in Stratford-Upon-Avon on 19 December 1938. On her death certificate, she is listed as the wife of the author Charles Harold Avery. Their son, William, who was living with her at the time of her death, is listed as the informant. According to his brother's, Benjamin Ricardo Avery, will where Charles was listed as a witness, Charles was living in Evesham with his brother Benjamin and his son William on 3 June 1943. Charles died on 25 September 1943 in Evesham, Worcestershire of a cerebral hemorrhage. On his death certificate, he is listed as a 76-year-old author. His son, William, was the informant on his death certificate as well as his brother Benjamin's death certificate when he died in Evesham, Worcestershire on 4 February 1947. William was also listed as the executor of Benjamin's will proved on 21 March 1947 in Birmingham. The son, William, died on 11 December 1971 in the Torbay hospital of cerebral vascular accident (stroke). His death certificate indicates he was a retired bank manager who resided at Windycliffe, 6 Spring Hill Road in the town of Totnes, Devon.

The following biography (next three paragraphs) prepared by his publisher appears to be fiction.

His biography (1951, Introduction to No Surrender!, Thomas Nelson and Sons) states that in 1879, Avery's family left England for Australia. During transit, his passenger ship was allegedly hijacked by Malay pirates while traversing the Strait of Malacca. The ship was forced to run aground, and although Avery survived, his parents did not. Avery spent three years living with the Lanuns, a native people from Malaysia. In 1882 he was rescued by a Dutch naval ship and reunited with his paternal aunt, Hanna Avery, his only living relative. Avery returned to his studies and attended Eton College in Berkshire. He later moved with his aunt to Edinburgh, Scotland where he took a job in the city's water department. Avery began writing in his early twenties, and in 1894 his book The Orderly Officer was published. The Edinburgh-based publisher Thomas Nelson and Sons published The Triple Alliance in 1897 and remained Avery's main publisher for the next 30 years.

Avery wrote mainly school stories. These books were popular among boys and girls in the later half of the 19th and earlier part of the 20th centuries and described life in public and private schools in England. For his books, he drew mainly on his experiences at Eton. Avery also wrote several adventure books and stories, often featuring pirates and again drawing on his childhood experiences in Malaysia. He was extremely prolific, writing over 50 books within a 45-year period.

Avery lived a very reclusive life, never marrying and living with his increasingly elderly aunt. He rarely left Edinburgh and never traveled outside of Britain as an adult, although he always expressed a wish to travel. In early 1941, in the midst of WWII, Avery retired and finally left Europe, supposedly to travel round the world. The last Avery was heard from was in a postcard to his Aunt, written in 1943 from Rio de Janeiro, Brazil. In 1951, after his death, Avery's publisher (Thomas Nelson and Sons Ltd.) released a special re-issue of No Surrender! (originally published in 1933), featuring the only known biography of Avery in the introduction.

== List of works ==
The Orderly Officer (Society for Promoting Christian Knowledge, 1894)
An Old Boy's Yarn (Cassell, 1895)
The School's Honour And Other Stories (Sunday School Union, 1895)
A Boy All Over (Sampson Low Marston, 1896)
Frank's First Term (Thomas Nelson, 1896)
Soldiers Of The Queen (Thomas Nelson, 1898)
Stolen Or Strayed (Thomas Nelson, 1899)
The Dormitory Flag (Thomas Nelson, 1899)
The Triple Alliance (Thomas Nelson, 1899)
A Toast-Fag And Other Stories (Thomas Nelson, 1900)
Head Or Tails (Thomas Nelson, 1900)
Mobsley's Mohicans (Thomas Nelson, 1900)
All Play And No Work (Partridge, 1901)

Cover Of All Play And No Work by Harold Avery

Gunpowder, Treason And Plot (Thomas Nelson, 1901)
With Wellington To Waterloo (Wells Gardner Darton, 1901)
Manor Pool Island (Collins, 1903)
Sale's Sharp Shooters (Thomas Nelson, 1903)
The House On The Moor (Thomas Nelson, 1903)
Highway Pirates (Thomas Nelson, 1904)
Out Of The Running (Collins, 1904)
Under Padlock And Seal (Thomas Nelson, 1905)
Firelock And Steel (Thomas Nelson, 1906)
Play The Game (Thomas Nelson, 1906)
The Magic Beads (Thomas Nelson, 1906)
Captain Swing (Thomas Nelson, 1907)
True To His Nickname (Thomas Nelson, 1907)
The Enchanted Egg (Thomas Nelson, 1908)
The Wizard's Wand (Thomas Nelson, 1908)
In Days Of Danger (Thomas Nelson, 1909)
A Week At Sea (Stanley Paul, 1910)
Off The Wicket (Thomas Nelson, 1910)
The Forbidden Room (Thomas Nelson, 1911)
Head Of The School (Partridge, 1912)
Not Cricket! (Partridge, 1912)
Talford's Last Term (Partridge, 1912)
The Chartered Company (Thomas Nelson, 1915)

Cover Of The Chartered Company by Harold Avery

Line Up (Collins, 1918)
Caught Out (Collins, 1919)

Cover Of Caught Out by Harold Avery

The Runaway (Collins, 1920)
Schoolboy Pluck (Nisbet & Co, 1921)
A Choice Of Chums (Thomas Nelson, 1922)
The Prefect's Patrol (Nisbet & Co, 1922)
A Fifth Form Mystery (Boys' Own Paper Office, 1923)
Between Two Schools (Thomas Nelson, 1923)
The Spoil-Sport and Double Dummy (Thomas Nelson, 1923)
A Sixth Form Feud (Ward Lock, 1926)
Pocket Thunder And Other Stories (Thomas Nelson, 1926)
Won For The School (Collins, 1927)
Any Port In A Storm And Other Stories (Thomas Nelson, 1928)
Day Boy Colours (Thomas Nelson, 1928)
Cock-House Of Claverill (Collins, 1929)
A Term On Trial (Partridge, 1930)
Who Goes There? (Thomas Nelson, 1930)
No Surrender (Thomas Nelson, 1933)
The Cock-House Cup (Thomas Nelson, 1933)
A Close Finish And Other School Stories (Partridge, 1934)
Chums At Charlhurst (Thomas Nelson, 1936)
Through Thick And Thin (Thomas Nelson, 1938)
The Side Line (Ward Lock, 1939)
A Girl At The Helm (Thomas Nelson, 1941)

== Sources ==
Genealogical researched completed by Terry Meinke in preparation for her book "My Avery Needle Case Collection", a book on Victorian Brass Needle Cases published in April 2012.

1) Correspondence dated 15 December 1922 from Harold Avery which mentions his book "The Prefects Patrol" and lists Wyndcliffe, Hornyold Road, Malvern as the return address. Found on an internet auction website, www.historyforsale.com in March 2011

2) Birth certificates: Charles Harold Avery, William Harold Avery

3) Birth Index: 1837-1915 England and Wales Free BMD Birth Index: A search of the birth index for all persons named Charles Avery, Charles Harold Avery and Harold Avery born between 1862 and 1872 was undertaken. Only one individual was found.

4) Marriage certificates: William Avery, Charles Harold Avery

5) Death certificates: William Avery, Maria Proctor Avery, John Avery, Catherine Avery, Charles Avery, Joseph Avery, Benjamin Avery, Winifred Avery, Charles Harold Avery, William Harold Avery

6) Death Index: 1916-2005 England and Wales Free BMD Death Index: William Harold Avery's death certificate does not list his parents. A search of the death index for all persons named William Harold Avery and William H. Avery born between 1902 and 1912 was undertaken. There were only two men born between 1905 and 1911, one was born in 1907 and the other in 1908. The one born in 1908 in Coventry appears to die in Coventry in 1965. The one born in 1907 in Malvern appears to die in Torbay in 1971.

7) Wills: John Avery, Catherine Avery, William Avery, Benjamin Ricardo Avery

8) Obituaries: William Avery, Joseph Avery. In William Avery's obituary, Harold Avery is listed as a son. In Joseph Avery's obituary, Mr. Harold Avery is listed as a nephew and popular writer of boys' school stories

9) Property transfer: Records at the Worcestershire Record Office. Files 705:414/8189/34/ii 1883-1913 and 705:414/8779/11/iv/5-11 1861-1914 related to the sale of Sherborne Cottage to J. English & Son Ltd.

10) Census: 1871, 1881, 1891, 1901, 1911 UK Censuses

- Dictionary of British Children's Fiction, A.K. Helbig and A.R. Perkins. Greenwood Press, UK, (1989).
- Bullies, Beaks And Flannelled Fools - An Annotated Bibliography Of Boys' School Fiction 1742-1990 by Robert J Kirkpatrick. Privately Published 1990
