= Sewing needle =

Needle with hole to hold thread for sewing

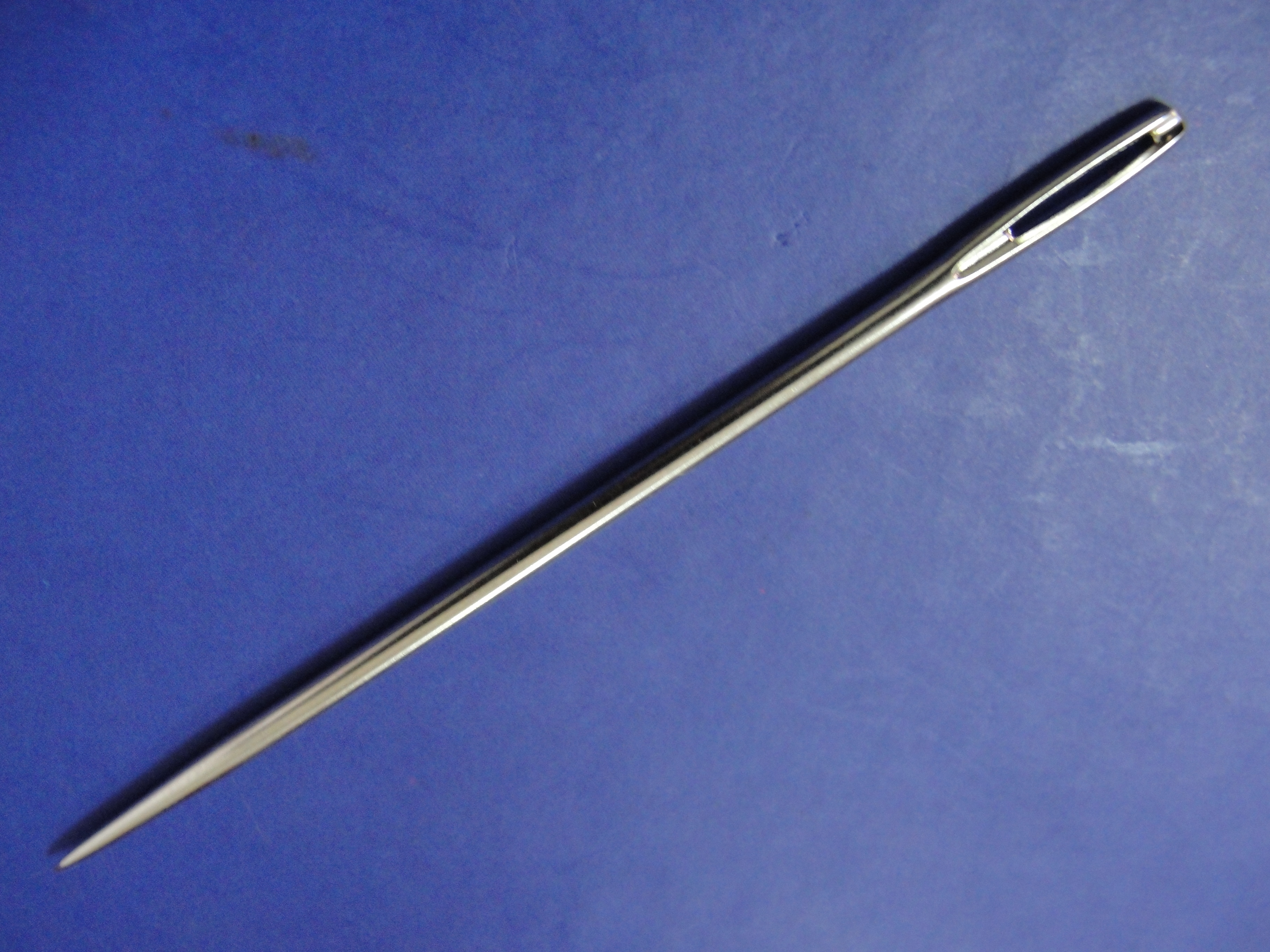
A sewing needle

A sewing needle, used for hand-sewing, is a long slender tool with a pointed tip at one end and a hole (or eye) to hold the sewing thread. The earliest needles were made of bone or wood; modern needles are manufactured from high carbon steel wire and are nickel- or 18K gold-plated for corrosion resistance. High-quality embroidery needles are plated with two-thirds platinum and one-third titanium alloy. Traditionally, needles have been kept in needle books or needlecases which have become objects of adornment. Sewing needles may also be kept in an étui, a small box that held needles and other items such as scissors, pencils and tweezers.

== Types of hand sewing needles ==
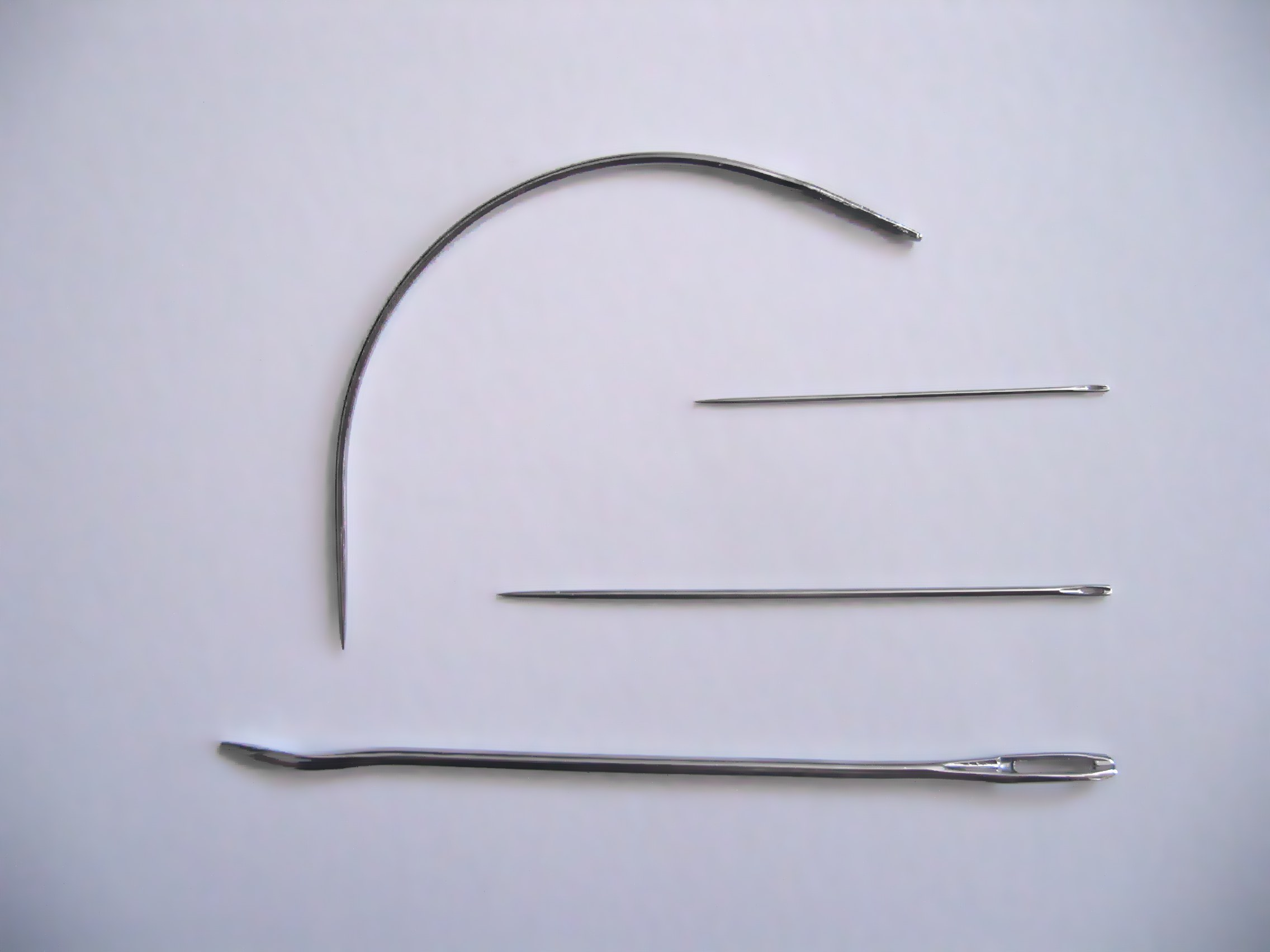
Needles used for hand sewing, from top to bottom: rounded upholstery needle, two straight needles, sail needle

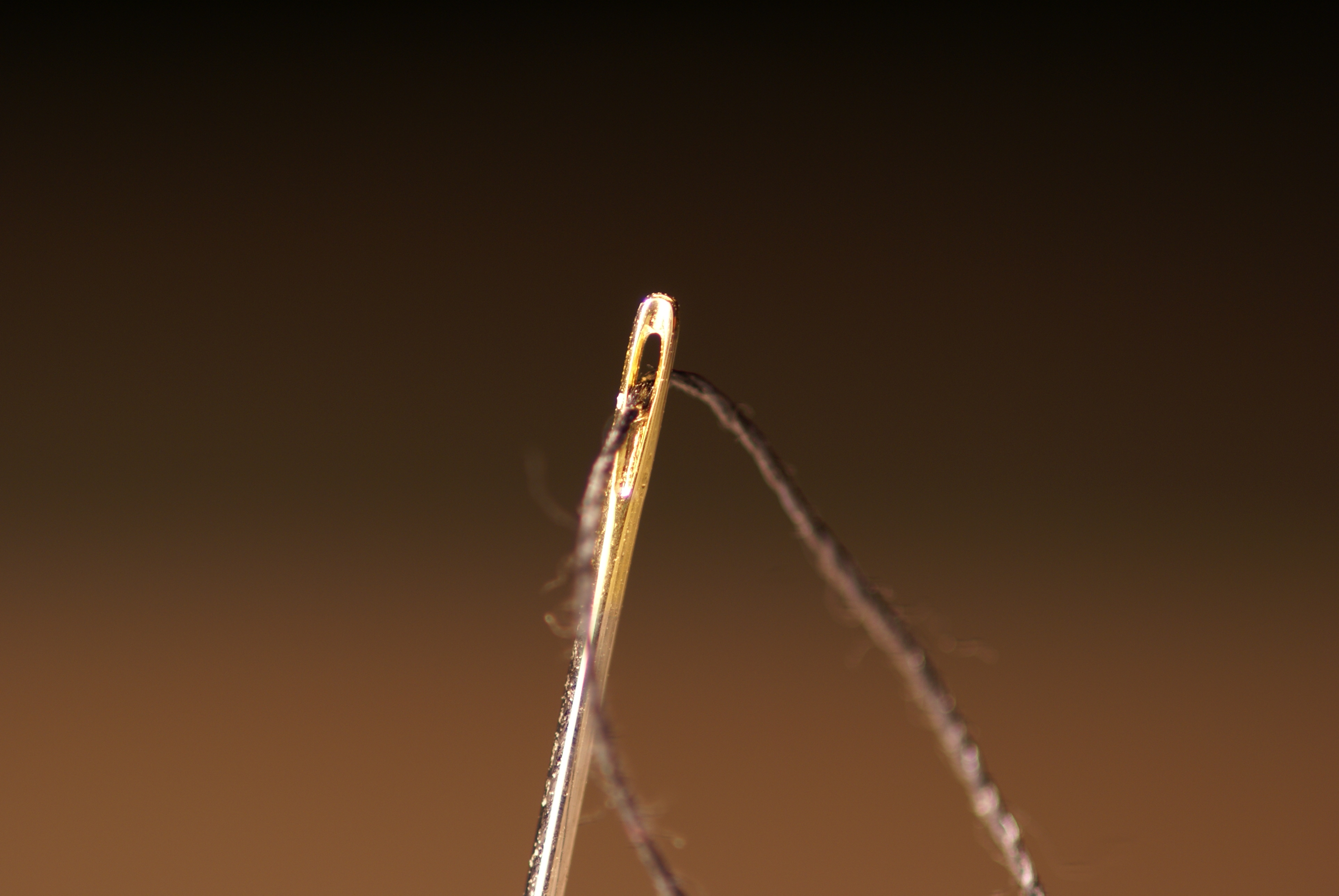
Thread through the eye of a No.5 sharp needle

Hand-sewing needles come in a variety of types/classes designed according to their intended use, with each type also varying in size.

- Sharp needles: used for general hand sewing; built with a sharp point, a round eye, and are of medium length. Those with a double-eyes are able to carry two strands of thread while minimizing fabric friction.
- Appliqué: These are considered another all-purpose needle for sewing, appliqué, and patchwork.
- Embroidery: Also known as crewel needles; identical to sharps but have a longer eye to enable easier threading of multiple embroidery threads and thicker yarns.
- Betweens or quilting: These needles are shorter than sharps, with a small rounded eye, and are used for making fine stitches on heavy fabrics such as in tailoring, quilt making, and other detailed handwork; note that some manufacturers also distinguish between quilting needles and quilting between needles, the latter being slightly shorter and narrower than the former.
- Milliners: A class of needles generally longer than sharps, useful for basting and pleating, normally used in millinery work.
- Easy- or self-threading: Also called calyx-eyed sharps, side threading, and spiral eye, these needles have an open slot into which a thread may easily be guided rather than the usual closed eye design.
- Beading: These needles are very fine, with a narrow eye to enable them to fit through the center of beads and sequins along with a long shaft to thread and hold a number of beads at a time.
- Bodkin: Also called ballpoints, this is a long, thick needle with a ballpoint end and a large, elongated eye. They can be flat or round and are generally used for threading elastic, ribbon, or tape through casings and lace openings.
- Chenille: These are similar to tapestry needles but with large, long eyes and a very sharp point to penetrate closely woven fabrics. Useful for ribbon embroidery.
- Darning: Sometimes called finishing needles, these are designed with a blunt tip and large eye making them similar to tapestry needles but longer; yarn darners are the heaviest sub-variety.
- Doll: Not designed for hand sewing at all, these needles are made long and thin and are used for soft sculpturing on dolls, particularly facial details.
- Leather: Also known as glovers and wedge needles, these have a triangular point designed to pierce leather without tearing it; often used on leather-like materials such as vinyl and plastic.
- Sailmaker: Similar to leather needles, but the triangular point extends further up the shaft; designed for sewing thick canvas or heavy leather.
- Tapestry: The large eye on these needles lets them carry a heavier weight yarn than other needles, and their blunt tip—usually bent at a slight angle from the rest of the needle—allows them to pass through loosely woven fabric such as embroidery canvas or even-weave material without catching or tearing it; comes in a double-eyed version for use on a mounted frame and with two colors of thread.
- Tatting: These are built long with an even thickness for their entire length, including at the eye, to enable the thread to be pulled through the double stitches used in tatting.
- Upholstery: These needles are heavy, long needles that may be straight or curved and are used for sewing heavy fabrics, upholstery work, tufting, and tying quilts; the curved variety is practical for difficult situations on furniture where a straight needle will not work. Heavy duty 12 in (30 cm) long needles are used for repairing mattresses. Straight sizes: 3-12 in long, curved: 1.5-6 in long.

== Parts of the sewing needle ==
There are 6 parts to a sewing needle. The main section is called the shaft. The next part is called the shank. The shank is the part that is attached to a sewing machine or the part that is held to hand sew. Next is the groove. The groove is a dent that runs along the shaft. It allows for the thread to lie against the needle as it passes through the fabric. The eye is the next part of the needle. It is the hole near the tip of the needle that the thread is passed through. The scarf is the next portion of the sewing needle. It allows for the hook to form a stitch. The last part of a sewing needle is the point. The point is the tip of the needle that penetrates the fabric.

== Needle size ==
Needle size is denoted by one or more numbers on the manufacturer's packet. The general convention for sizing of needles, like that of wire gauges, is that within any given class of needle the length and thickness of a needle increases as the size number decreases. For example, a size 9 needle will be thicker and longer than a size 12 needle. However, the needle sizes are not standardized and so a size 10 of one class may be (and in some cases actually is) either thinner or finer than a size 12 of another type. Where a packet contains a needle count followed by two size numbers such as "20 Sharps 5/10" the second set of numbers corresponds to the range of sizes of the needle within the packet, in this case typically ten sharps needles of size 5 and ten of size 10 (for a total of 20 needles). As another example, a packet labeled "16 Milliners 3/9" would contain 16 milliners needles ranging in sizes from 3 to 9.

== History ==
=== Prehistoric sewing needles ===
Selected archaeological sites with eyed bone needles aged between 45,000 and 25,000 years BP from the ROAD database (CC BY-SA 4.0 ROCEEH)

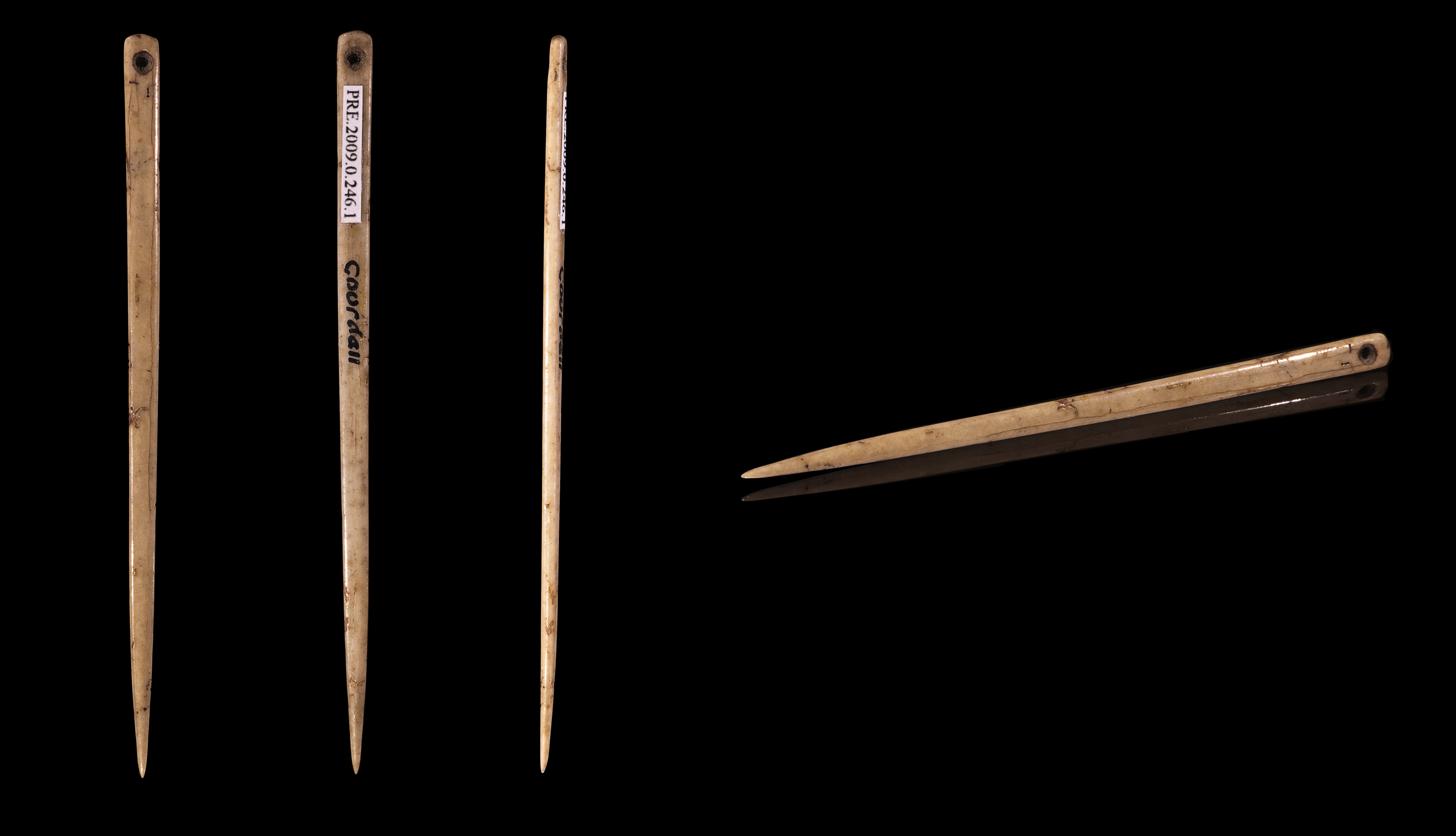
Magdalenian, Gourdan-Polignan France – Muséum of Toulouse

The first form of sewing was probably tying together animal skins using shards of bone as needles, with animal sinew or plant material as thread. The early limitation was the ability to produce a small enough hole in a needle matrix, such as a bone sliver, not to damage the material. Traces of this survive in the use of awls to make eyelet holes in fabric by separating rather than cutting the threads. Bone awls have been found in southern Africa at Blombos Cave dated to 73,000-70,000 years ago.

A point that might be from a bone needle dates to 61,000 years ago and was discovered in Sibudu Cave, South Africa. A needle made from bird bone and attributed to archaic humans, the Denisovans, estimated to be around 50,000 years-old, and was found in Denisova Cave. A bone needle, dated to the Aurignacian age (47,000 to 41,000 years ago), was discovered in Potok Cave (Slovene: Potočka zijalka) in the Eastern Karawanks, Slovenia. Bone and ivory needles found in the Xiaogushan prehistoric site in Liaoning province date between 30,000 and 23,000 years old. Ivory needles were also found dated to 30,000 years ago at the Kostenki site in Russia. 8,600-year-old Neolithic needle bones were discovered at Ekşi Höyük, western Anatolia, in present-day Denizli Province. Flinders Petrie found copper sewing needles at Naqada, Egypt, ranging from 4400 BC to 3000 BC. Iron sewing needles were found at the Oppidum of Manching, dating to the third century BC.

=== Ancient sewing needles ===
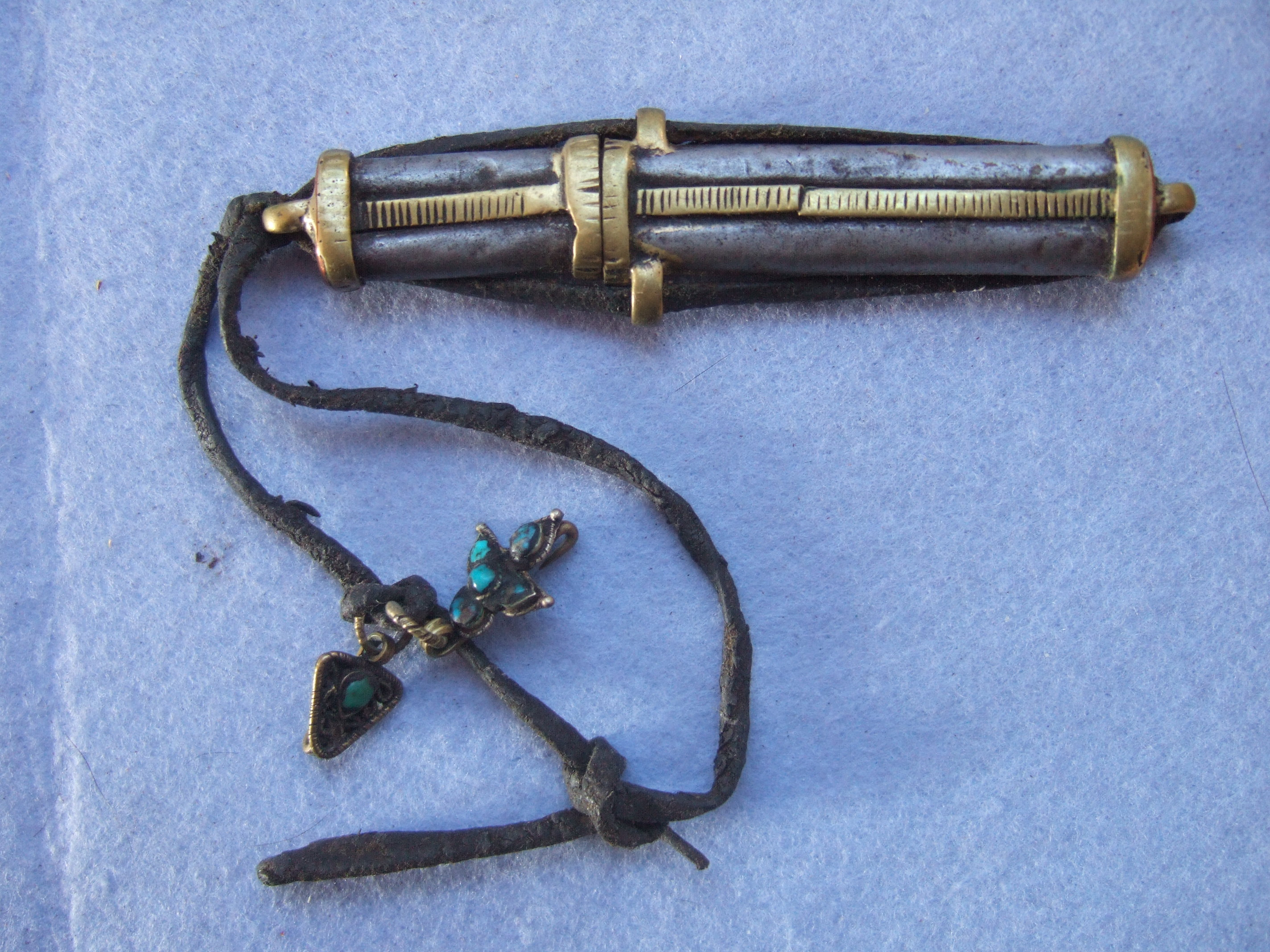
Tibetan needle-case

A form of needle lace named nålebinding seems to generally predate knitting and crochet by thousands of years, partly because it can use far shorter rough-graded threads than knitting does.

Native Americans were known to use sewing needles from natural sources. One such source, the agave plant, provided both the needle and the "thread." The agave leaf would be soaked for an extended period of time, leaving a pulp, long, stringy fibres, and a sharp tip connecting the ends of the fibres. The "needle" is essentially what was the tip end of the leaf. Once the fibres dried, the fibres and "needle" could then be used to sew items together.

Sewing needles are an application of wire-making technology, which started to appear in the second millennium B.C. Some fine examples of Bronze Age gold toques are made of very consistent gold wire, which is more malleable than bronze. However, copper and bronze needles do not need to be as long, as the eye can be made by turning the wire back on itself and redrawing it through the die.

=== Later sewing needles ===
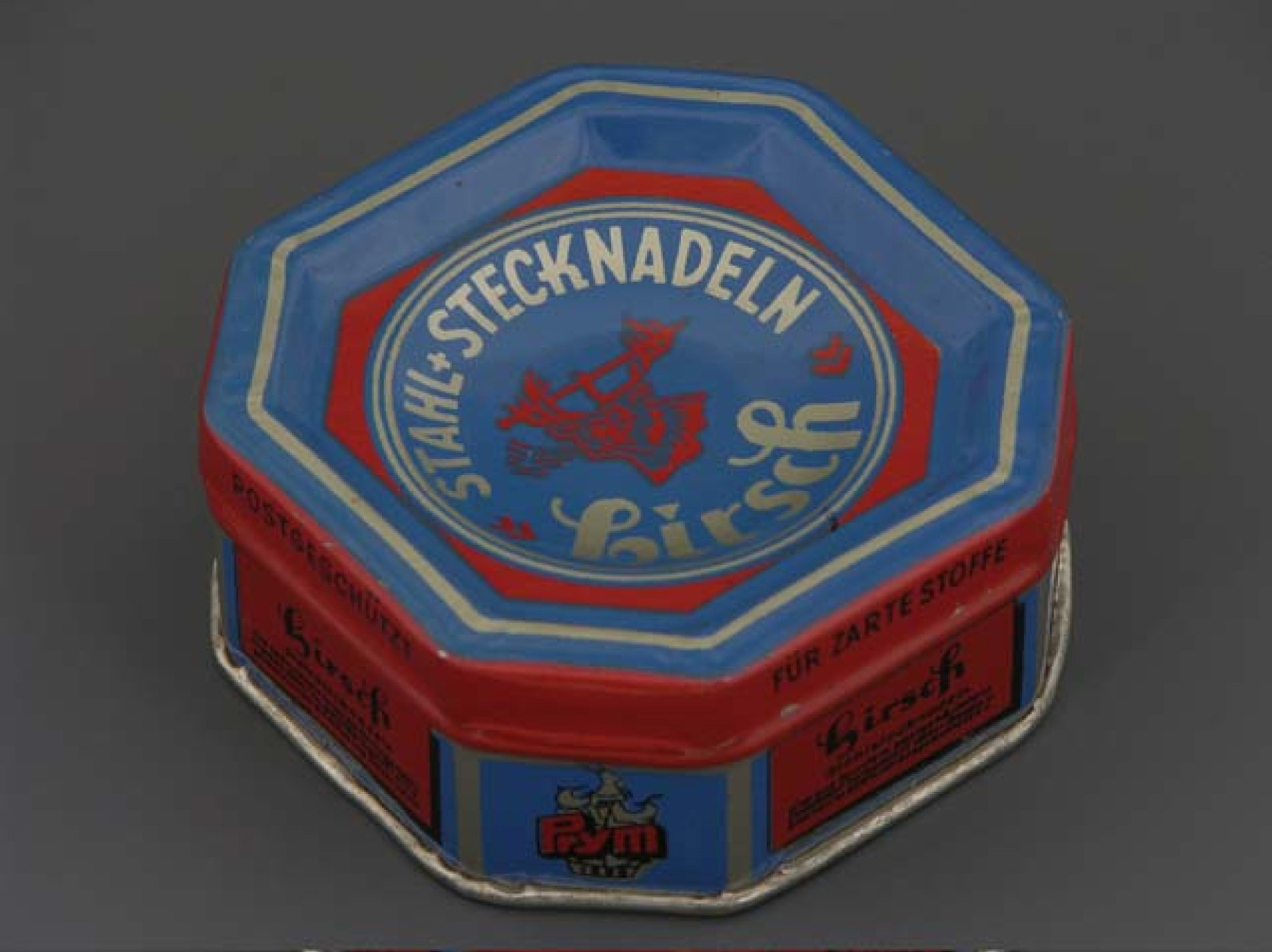
Metal container for pins from the second half of the 20th century. From the Museo del Objeto del Objeto collection

The next major break-through in needle-making was the arrival of high-quality steel-making technology from China in the tenth century, principally in Spain in the form of the Catalan furnace, which soon extended to produce reasonably high quality steel in significant volumes. This technology later extended to Germany and France, although not significantly in England. England began creating needles in 1639 at Redditch, creating the drawn-wire technique still in common use today. About 1655, needle manufacturers were sufficiently independent to establish a Guild of Needlemakers in London, although Redditch remained the principal place of manufacture. In Japan, Hari-Kuyo, the Festival of Broken Needles, dates back to the 1600s.

== See also ==
- Needle threader
- Needlecase
- Sewing machine needle
- Thimble
- Treen
- Hari-Kuyō
