= Chums (paper) =

1892–1941 British boys' periodical

- Type: Weekly paper (1892 – 1932); Monthly (1932 – 1934); Yearly
- Owner(s): Cassell & Company (1892–January 1927); Amalgamated Press (February 1927 – 1941)
- Publisher: Cassell and Company (1892–January 1927); Amalgamated Press
- Editor: 1892 – 1893: Max Pemberton 1893 – c. 1907: Ernest Foster; 1907 – 1915: Ernest H. Robinson; 1915 – 1918: F. Knowles Campling; 1918 – 1920: A. Donnelly Aitken; 1920 – 1924: Clarence Winchester; 1924 – 1927: Arthur L. Hayward; 1926 – 1932: Draycot M. Dell 1939 – 1940: W.B. Home-Gall
- Founded: 1892
- Ceased publication: September 1941
- Sister newspapers: Modern Boy; Ranger

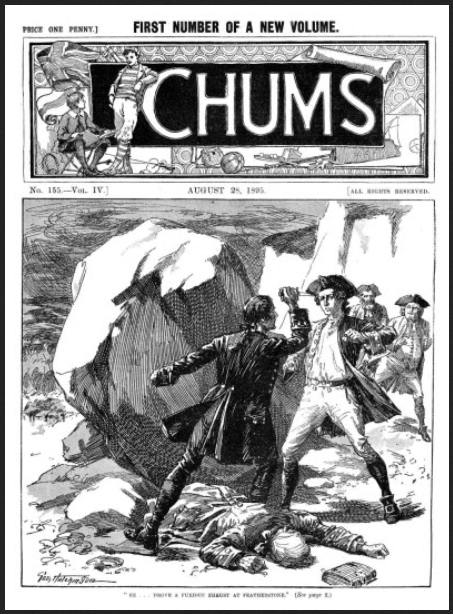
The front page from Chums for 28 August 1895.

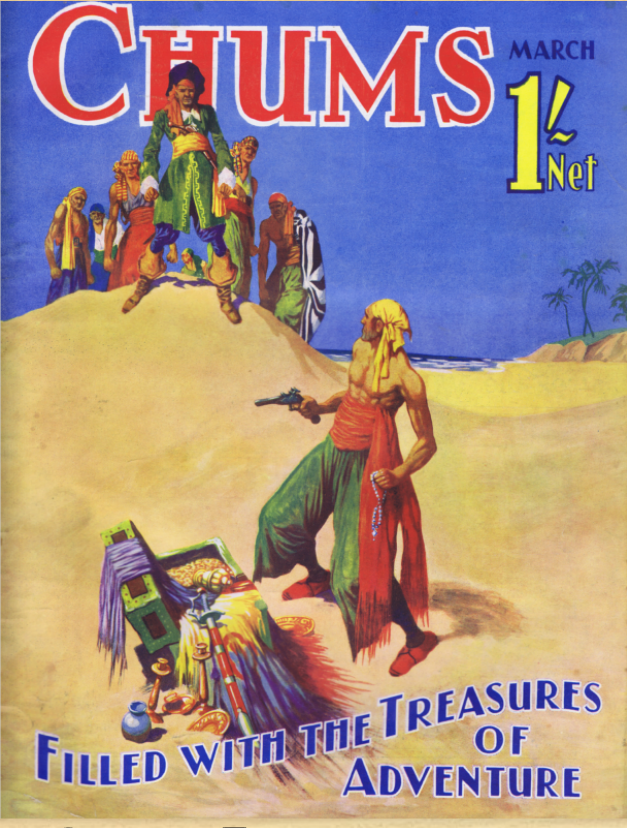
A cover from the early 1930s, by Cecil Glossop

Chums was a boys' weekly newspaper started in 1892 by Cassell & Company and later, from 1927, published by Amalgamated Press. The publisher gathered the weekly paper into monthly and annual editions. The monthly versions were published on the 25th of the month, and up to November 1920 included all the content of the weekly editions. From then on, the monthly editions had all the story content of the weeklies, but left out the covers. This left a gap which was then filled by short stories, articles and even serials that were not included in the weekly edition. The serial ceased publication in 1941.

Chums was notably the sponsor of the Chums League, Chums Society of Stamp Collectors, Chums Scouts, the British Boy Scouts and the British Boys Naval Brigade/National Naval Cadets. Chums is one of the most highly sought-after boys' papers by collectors due to its distinctive and attractively illustrated red covers.

== History ==
Started by Cassell & Company in 1892 as a weekly newspaper for boys, it was apparently modeled on — and in competition for readers with — The Boy's Own Paper, having articles and stories covering various topics. Chums launched with a serial "For Glory and Renown" by D. H. Parry and articles on football training, Harrow School, and Julius Caesar in Britain. Initially Chums had problems gaining readers but two serials, "The Iron Pirate", by first editor Max Pemberton in 1892, and Treasure Island by Robert Louis Stevenson in 1894, pushed the paper into some success. It is interesting to note that when Treasure Island was first published as a serial in Young Folks in 1881, it was not a success. Robert Leighton, a sub-editor, said that as a serial, it was a failure, as it took too long to get to the action.

=== Amalgamated Press buys ===
Amalgamated Press bought Chums in January 1927 and continued it as a weekly. With the 2 July 1932 issue, its publishing schedule was reduced to a monthly issue. The last monthly issue was in July 1934 and became an annual publication issued in September. The serial ceased publication with its 9 September 1941 issue due to wartime paper shortages.

== Format ==
Chums was issued in three different formats, weekly, monthly, and annually. While initially published as a weekly paper, a monthly edition was issued including all the weekly issues with a color cover. Some material was only included in the weekly or monthly formats In the weekly, this showed up as an eight-page article insert pages numbered i-viii. The monthly had a color print included.

== Sponsorship of youth organizations ==
=== Chums Scouts & British Boy Scouts ===
Chums' "On the Watch Tower" news column reported on 11 September 1907 that Robert Baden-Powell's Brownsea Island Scout camp was proposed and his recommendation that Boy Scout groups should be formed. In the 12 February 1908 issue, the editor indicated there was a reader proposing to start a scout company under the "Chum Scout" name and suggested that they wear the 'Chums' League badge. In the next issue, the editor indicated more readers had written in about starting a League of Chums Scouts with a reply that they were in discussions with Baden-Powell. The following issue had an article on the Brownsea Island Camp by Baden-Powell and indicated future news on the proposed 'Chums' League of Scouts. However, the publication then fell silent on the 'Chum' Scouts. In October 1908, a recurring character, Waggles, made fun of boy scouts. The silence, then the turnabout to being negative may have stemmed from C. Arthur Pearson Limited launching The Scout paper which was denoted as "founded by" Baden-Powell and the "Official Journal" of Baden-Powell's own Boy Scout organization.

In June 1909, Chums started including boy scout stories. In the 30 June issue, the editor's column indicated that the Chum scouts patrols were still going "strong" and that a union of the various patrols was being considered. Chums announced the launch of the British Boy Scouts as a national organisation in the 21 July 1909 issue. A British Boy Scout column was included in future issues, later becoming a full page. Chums indicated in late December that the BBS had gained members in Australia, Africa, and Canada. Chums also includes some of the earliest references to "Sea Scouts". In mid-1911, the BBS column ended when the original BBS leaders, H. Moore and W.G. Whitby, left the BBS.

=== British Boys Naval Brigade / National Naval Cadets ===
In March 1909, Chums sponsored The British Boys Naval Brigade, a uniformed youth organization for boys ages 10 to 17. With the Brigade's launch in May as a national organization, it changed its name to The National Naval Cadets. The organization's columns in Chums were of an instructional nature rather than a news journal. Chums was also used as an enrolment tool. By June articles on the National Naval Cadets subtitled it, first as "Scouts of the Sea" then later "Sea Scouts of the Empire".

The British Boy Scouts and National Naval Cadets were both headquartered in Battersea, London. Chums referred to them together as Chums United Service.

== Writers ==
The following list of authors is by no means complete:

- L. J. Beeston
- Harry Blyth
- Herbert Eastwick Compton
- Arthur J. Daniels
- George Manville Fenn
- Henry Frith
- G. A. Henty
- Andrew Home
- Ascott R. Hope
- J. R. Hutchinson
- Warren Killingworth
- Robert Leighton
- John K. Leys
- John Mackie
- Standish O'Grady
- Barry Pain
- D. H. Parry
- Max Pemberton
- Arthur Rigby
- Robert Louis Stevenson
- S. Walkey
- Fred Whishaw

== Artists ==
The following artist represent only some of those who illustrated stories in Chums

- Stanley Berkeley
- Gordon Browne
- Tom Browne. R. I.
- J. Finnemore
- Paul Hardy
- Charles Harrison
- George Wylie Hutchinson
- Godfrey Merry
- A. Monro
- Harry Payne
- Alfred Pearce
- Charles L. Pott
- Richard Simkin
- C. J. Staniland, R. I.

== See also ==
- Boys' Life
- Boys' Own
- The Boy's Own Paper
