= Charles Joseph Staniland =

British artist and illustrator

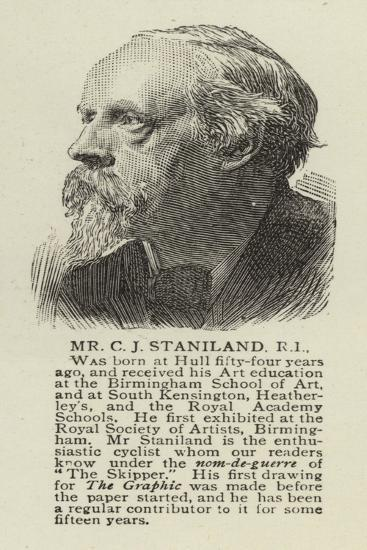
- Born: 19 June 1838; Kingston upon Hull, East Riding of Yorkshire, England
- Died: 16 June 1916 (aged 77); Birmingham, Warwickshire, England
- Occupations: Artist and illustrator
- Years active: 1861–1906
- Known for: Depiction of marine scenes
- Notable work: The Emigrant Ship

Charles Joseph Staniland ROI RI (19 June 1838 – 16 June 1916) was a prolific British genre, historical, and marine painter and a leading Social Realist illustrator. He was a mainstay of the Illustrated London News and The Graphic in the 1870s and 1880s.

== Early life ==
Staniland was born at Kingston upon Hull in Yorkshire on (19 June 1838) the son of Joseph Staniland, a merchant. He studied at the Birmingham School of Art under David Wilkie Raimbach, (Note: D. W. Raimbach was the son of engraver Abraham Raimbach. He was appointed headmaster of the Birmingham School of Art in 1858.) at the Heatherley School of Fine Art, and the Normal Training School of Art in South Kensington. He was admitted as a student of the Royal Academy on 2 May 1861, having successfully completed his probationary term.

He married Elizabeth Parsons Buckman (c. 1844–1920) in Edgbaston, Warwick, on 15 September 1868.. The couple had five children, all of whom survived to adulthood:

- Charles Norman Staniland (12 March 1871 – 31 May 1935) (Note: Occupation listed as Electrical Engineer in the 1911 census, by which time he was living with his wife and four children.)
- Maud Elizabeth Staniland (born 6 February 1873) (Note: Her occupation was an insurance clerk in the 1901 census. She married Percy Ross Boyle (born 6 March 1871) a clerk, at Tooting on 2 June 1906.)
- Ellen Laura Sylvia Staniland (born 7 March 1874) (Note: She married Charles Pervical Cousins on 4 June 1898.)
- Catherine Wells Staniland (born 20 November 1877) (Note: Catherine Wells seems to have had an issue with her age, as she recorded it as 30 years of age in the 1911 census, when she was 33. She merely gave her age as "Full" at her marriage in Fleet to bank clerk Norman Brain Edwards (26 November 1887 – 26 February 1952) nearly ten years younger, and gave her year of birth as 1885 in the 1939 Register, though with the correct day and month. However her baptismal record of 25 October 1878 gives her date of birth as 20 November, presumably in 1877, her birth was registered in the first quarter of 1878,, and the 1881 census gives her age as three.)
- Eric Flemming Staniland (17 December 1880 – 23 June 1943) (Note: He gives his year of birth as 1878 in the 1939 Register, but his baptismal record and the 1881 census give his year of birth as 1880. His occupation was that of farmer in the 1901 census. but he was the manager of a bottling plant by 1939.)

By 1871 Staniland was living with his wife and first child at Hogarth Cottage in Chiswick, and was doing well enough to have a monthly nurse (Note: His son was only three weeks old at the time of the census.) as well as a servant. By 1881, he was living at 15 Steele's Road in Hampstead with his wife and all five of his children. He also had two live-in domestic servants and a governess for his children. The governess was Rosa Wells and her brother, (Note: Kirkpatrick refers to Josiah as Rosa's husband, but the census return for 1881 shows both Rosa and Josiah as unmarried, earlier census returns show that Josiah had a sister Rosa of the correct age, and the Suffolk Artists website identify them as brother and sister.) Josiah (Note: Johnson and Greutzner identify him as Joseph Robert Wells.) Robert Wells (c. 1849–1897), an artist, was a boarder.

Staniland and Wells collaborated on several book illustration projects including The Three Admirals by William Henry Giles Kingston (Griffith & Farran. London 1878) and The Pirate Island by Harry Collingwood (Blackie and Son, London, 1885). Wells was the principal marine artist for The Illustrated London News for 1873–1883, specialising in marine subjects and ship portraits. Houfe refers to him as the "Fleet Special Artist" of Illustrated London News. Wells was still living with the Stanilands at the time of the 1891 census. Wells died on 27 June 1897 in Brookwood and Holloway Mental Hospital. (Note: He had been committed by his sister Rosa on 30 October 1896, and was diagnosed with General Paralysis.)

Staniland was living with his wife and his three unmarried children at 3 Hawkswood Crescent, in Chingford, Essex, at the time of the 1901 census. By 1911, he was living with his daughter Catherine at 1 Millfield Villas, Fleet, Hampshire. His wife was with their daughter Ellen's husband and family at the time of the census. It is not clear if the couple had split up or if his wife was just on a visit.

Staniland died on 16 June 1916, at 134 Oxford Road, Acock's Green, Birmingham. He does not appear to have left a will. His wife survived until 1920.

== Works ==
Staniland worked as a painter and as an illustrator. He produced a large volume of work for the illustrated newspapers.

=== Painting ===
Staniland began exhibiting at the Royal Academy in 1863 and continued to do so irregularly until 1881. (Note: Staniland exhibited as follows from 1880: five works at the Royal Birmingham Society of Artists, one work at the Fine Art Society, one work at the Glasgow Institute of the Fine Arts, 13 works at the Walker Art Gallery, Liverpool, nine works at the Manchester City Art Gallery, one work at the Royal Academy (in 1881), and 26 works at the Royal Institute of Painters in Water Colours. This list excludes his exhibits before 1881. He had started exhibiting at the Royal Academy in 1863 and exhibited there in 1865, 1874, 1877, and 1878. As well as the five exhibits at the Royal Academy he also exhibited twice at the British Institution and seven times at the Society of British Artists between 1861 and 1878. Wood notes that he exhibited 62 works, including at the New Watercolour Society.)

Staniland was elected an associate of the RI in 1875, and became a full member in 1879. He resigned in 1890. He was a member of the ROI from his election in 1883 until his resignation in 1896.

Staniland painted in both watercolours and oils, and sometimes painted on a theme. In the case of The Emigrant Ship, Staniland exhibited a watercolour The last Day in Old England at the RI in 1875. This showed a party of emigrants about to leave the country, in a scene near the docks. The Globe said that the watercolour was "full of suggestion". In the Emigrant Ship also known as Good-Bye! we see the quayside as the ship is about to depart. The Liverpool Mercury stated that the painting was "full of heart-rending scenes in tearing asunder family ties" and that the painting was truly "a splendid work. . . The subject is well chosen as regards the position of the vessel, and there is a beautiful bit of dim smoky distance, so like London, and so cleverly done. To those who like this kind of subject it will prove a world of pleasure in examining for years. Treuherz notes that among other social realist themes The Graphic publish several scenes of emigrants leaving by ship, with lively portrayals of both the excitement and pain of departure, and cites this work by Staniland as an example.

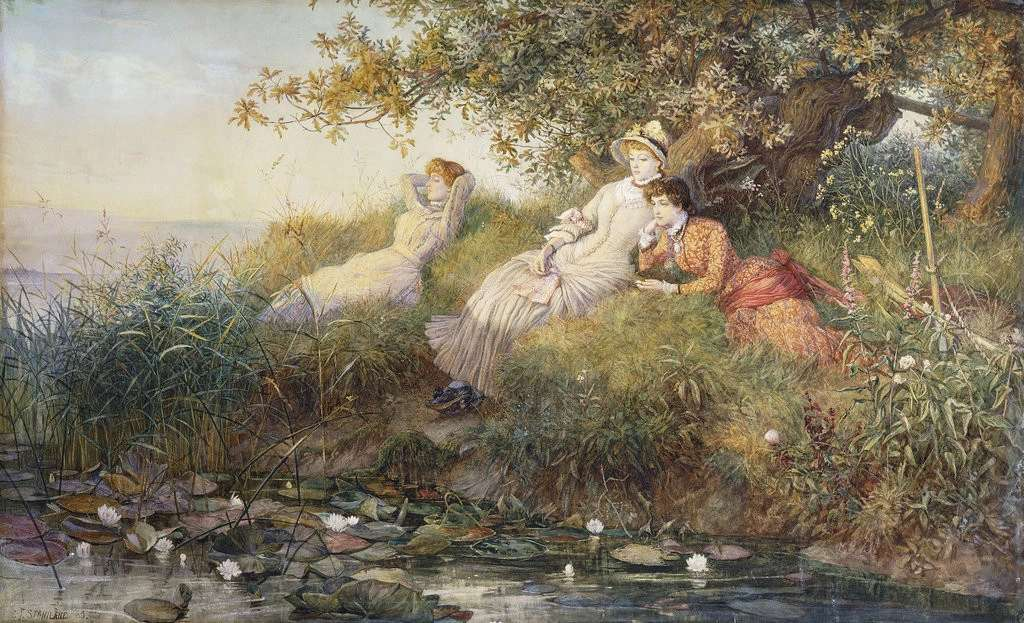
The Lotus Eaters (watercolour and pencil heightened with white, 75x122 cm), 1883

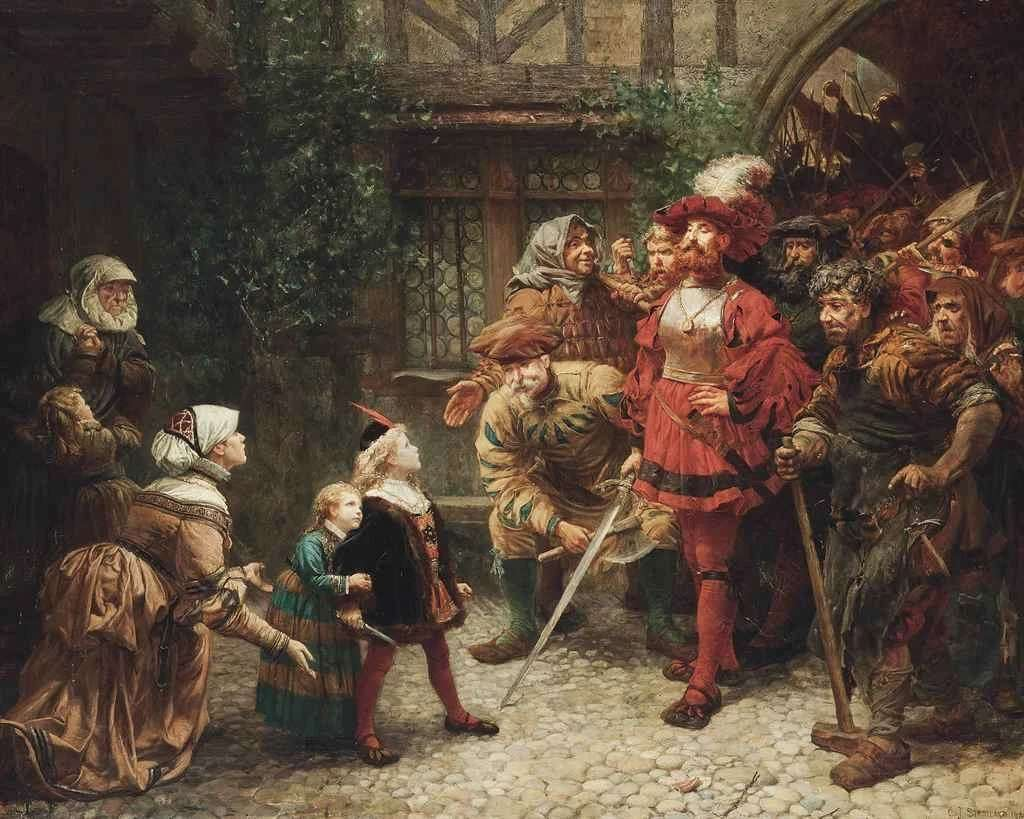
An émeute (popular uprising) in the 16th century. (oil on canvas 102x128 cm), 1874

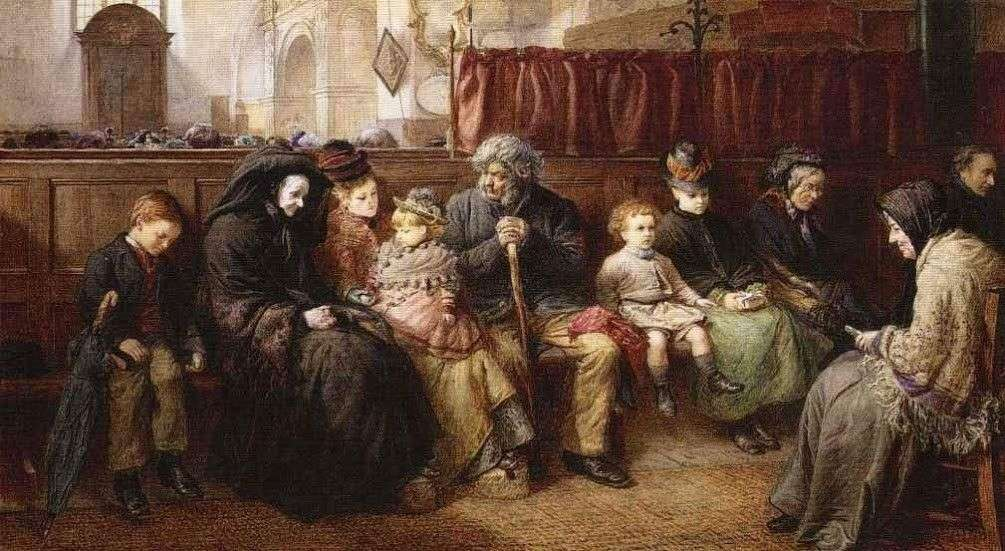
At the Back of Church (pencil and watercolour 51x92 cm), 1876

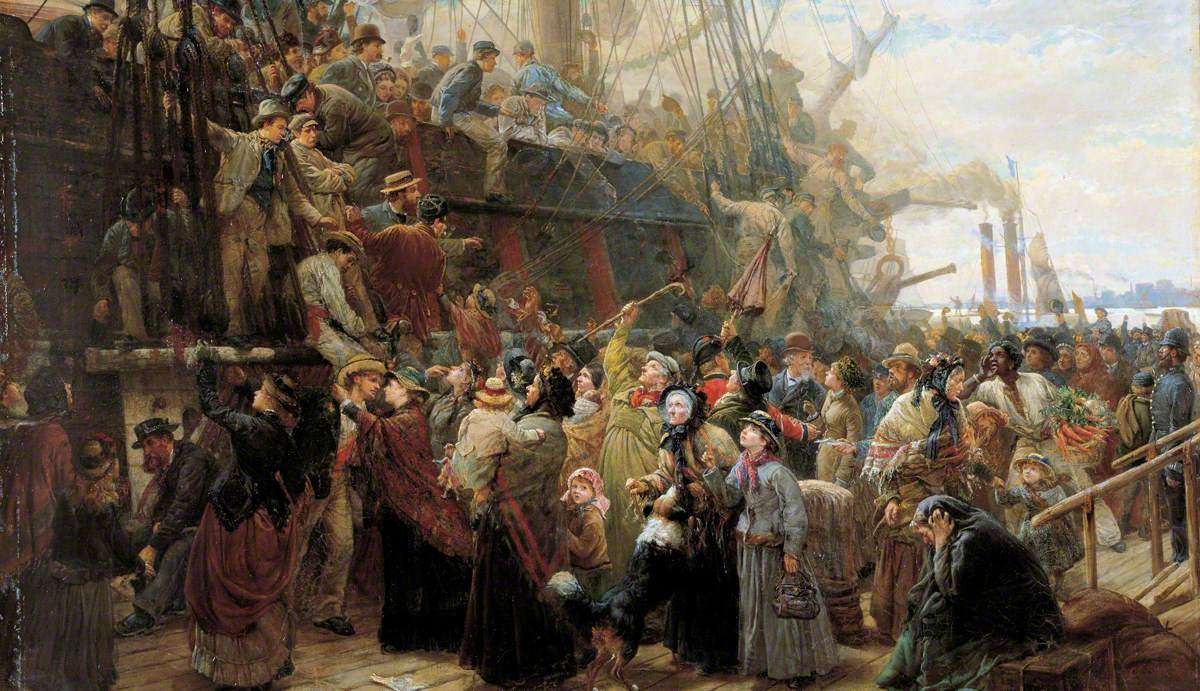
The Emigrant Ship (Oil on canvas 104x176 cm), 1878

=== Magazine and newspaper illustration ===
As an illustrator, Staniland was primarily a newspaper and magazine illustrator. Staniland became a staff member of the Illustrated London News and later of The Graphic. He contributed to a wide range of magazines including:

- Atalanta
- Aunt Judy's Magazine
- The Boy's Own Paper
- The British Workman
- Cassell's Family Magazine
- The Children's Friend
- Chums
- The English Illustrated Magazine
- Golden Hours
- Good Words
- Harper's Weekly
- The Illustrated London News
- The Leisure Hour
- London Society
- Longman's Magazine
- The Pall Mall Magazine
- The Quiver
- Short Stories
- The Strand Magazine
- The Wide World Magazine

In 1886 Staniland not only illustrated but also authored a two part account of the Lifeboats and Lifeboat-men of Great Britain. This ran in The English Illustrated Magazine in February and March of that year.

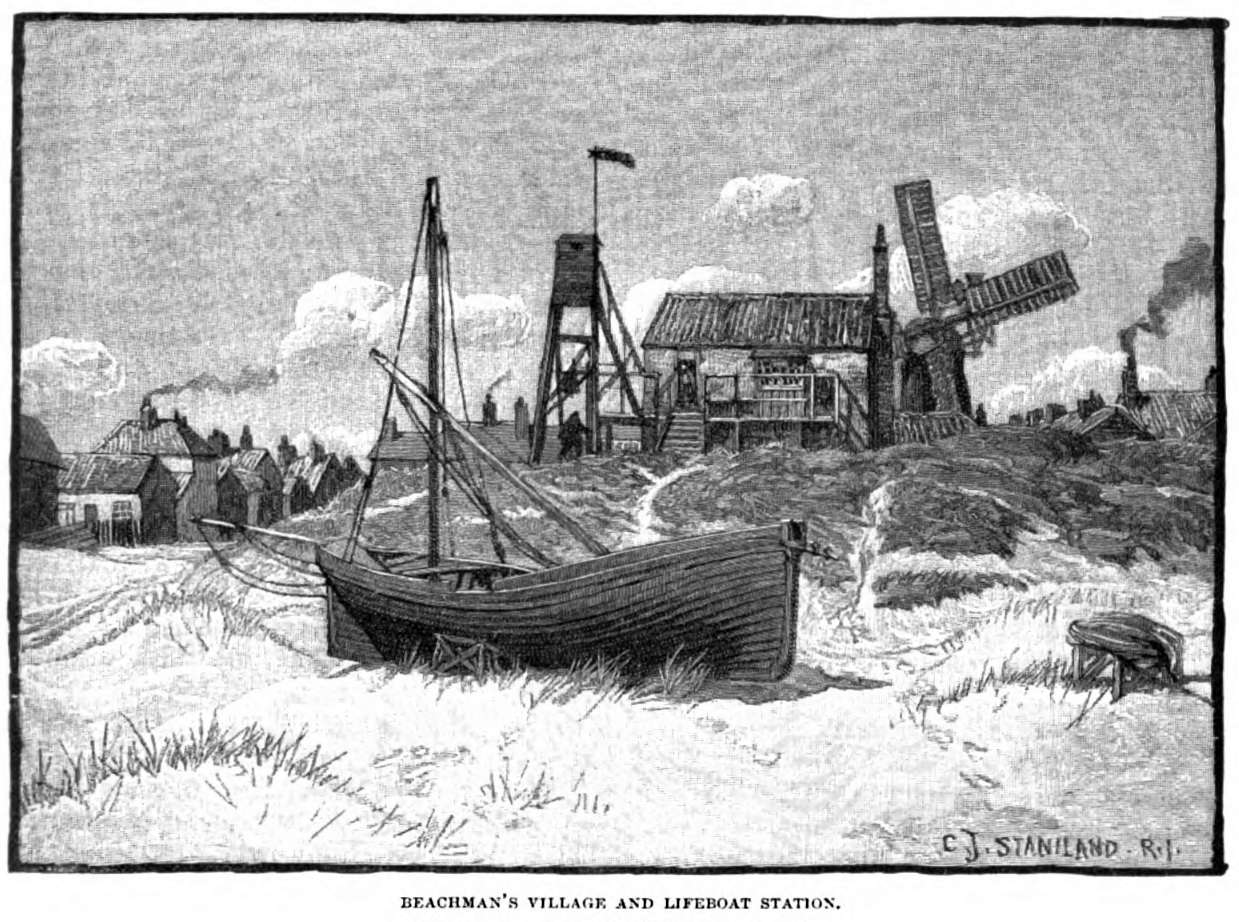
The lifeboat Station

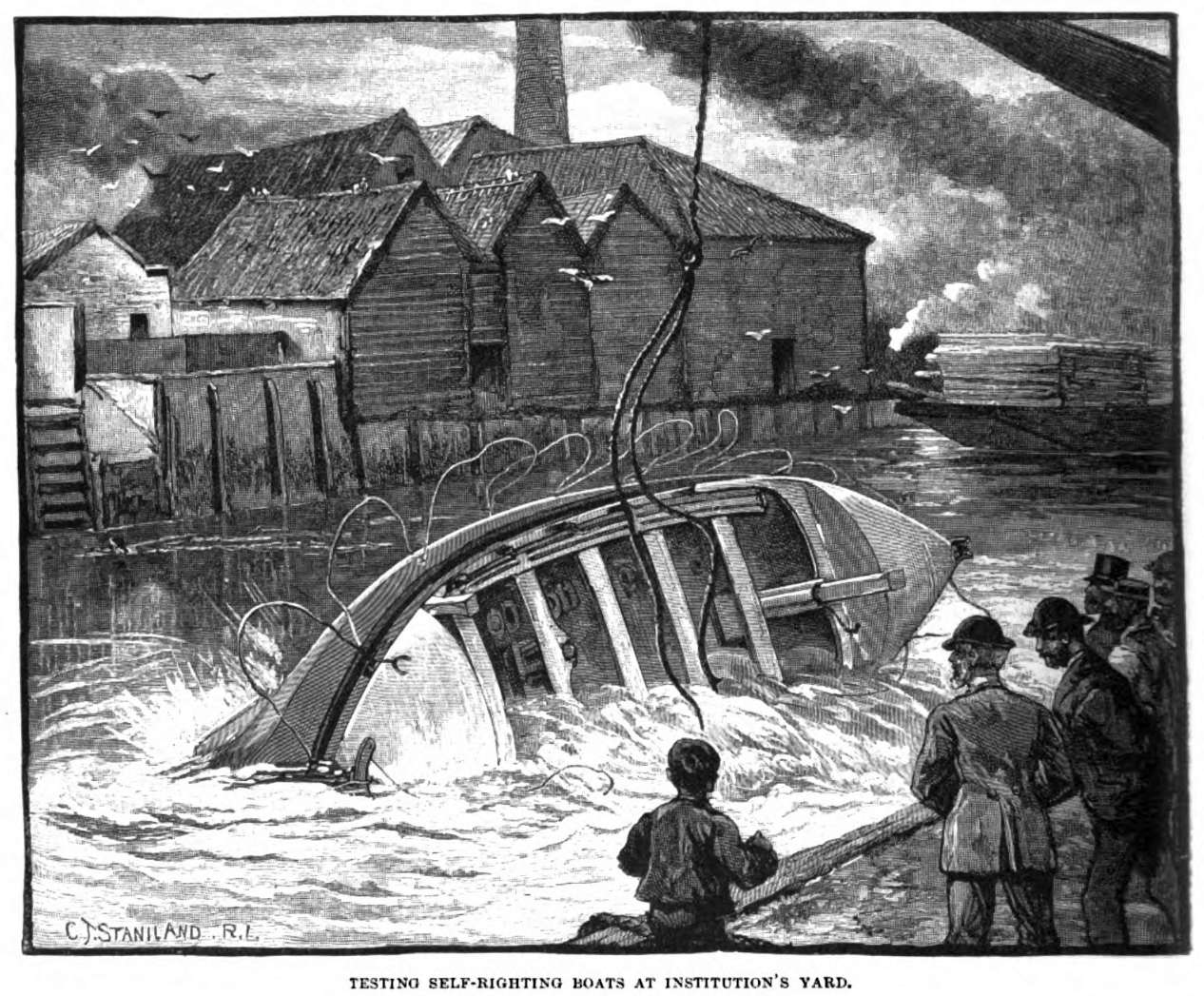
Testing self-righting boats

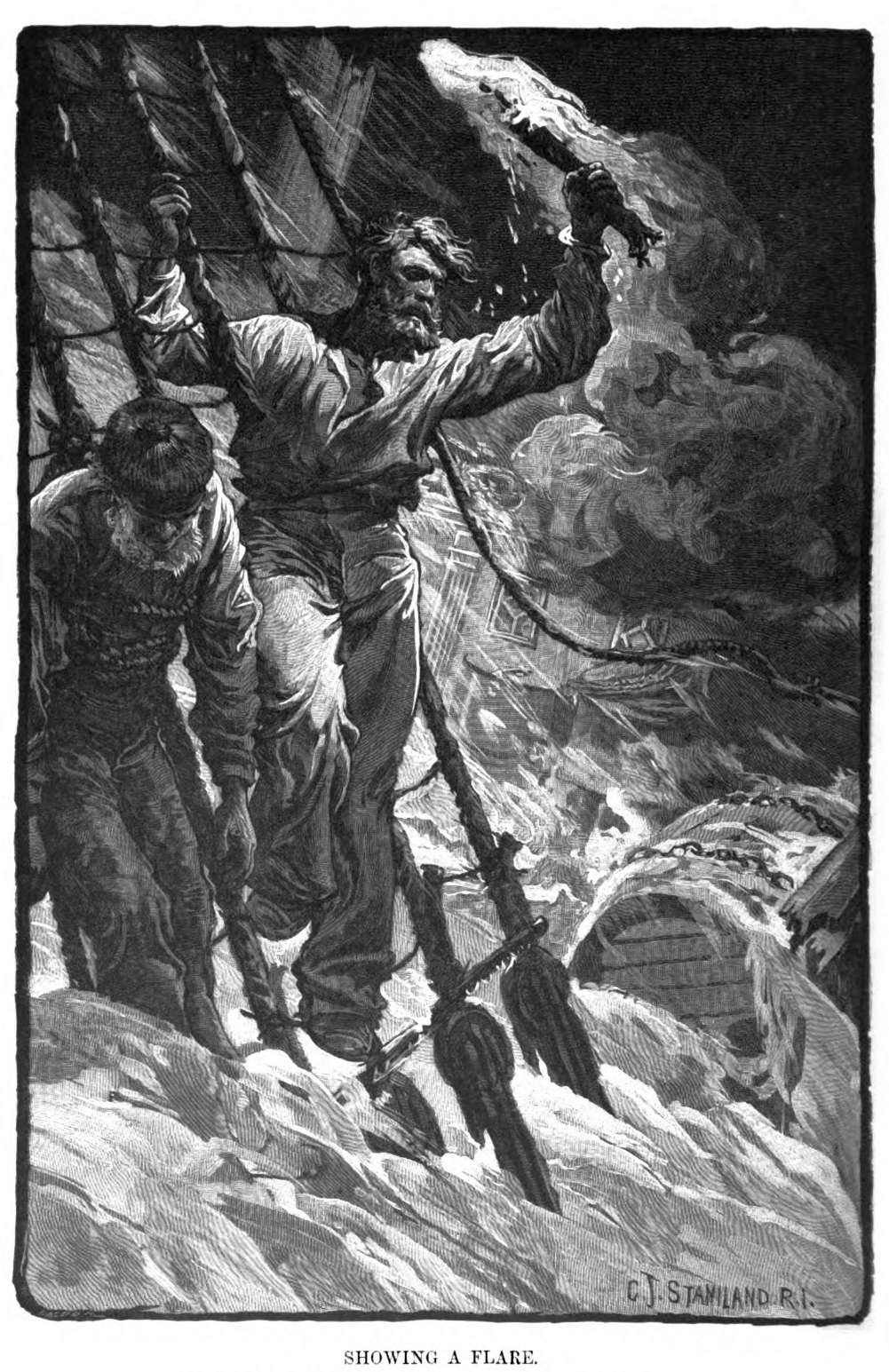
Showing a Flare

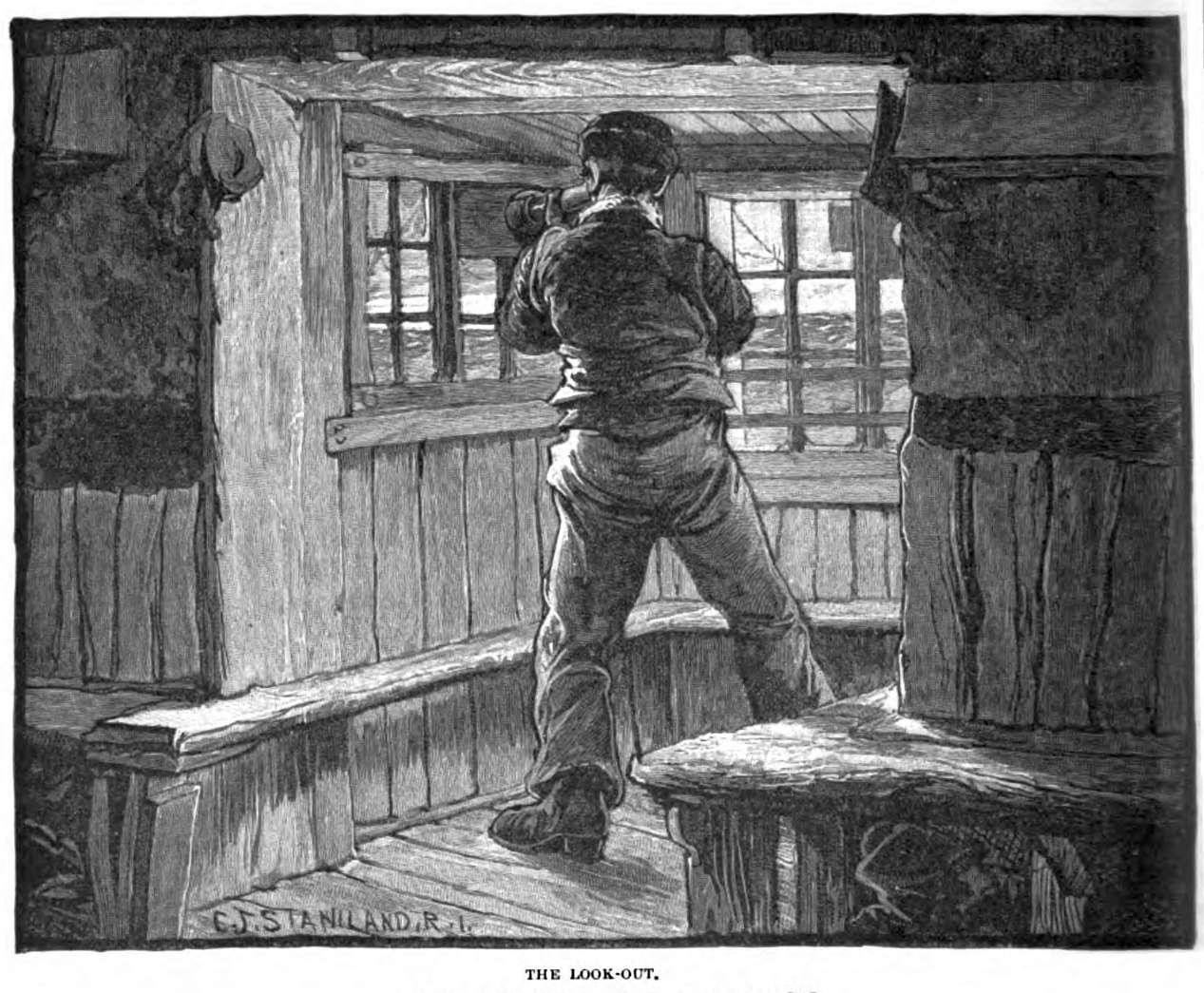
The Look Out

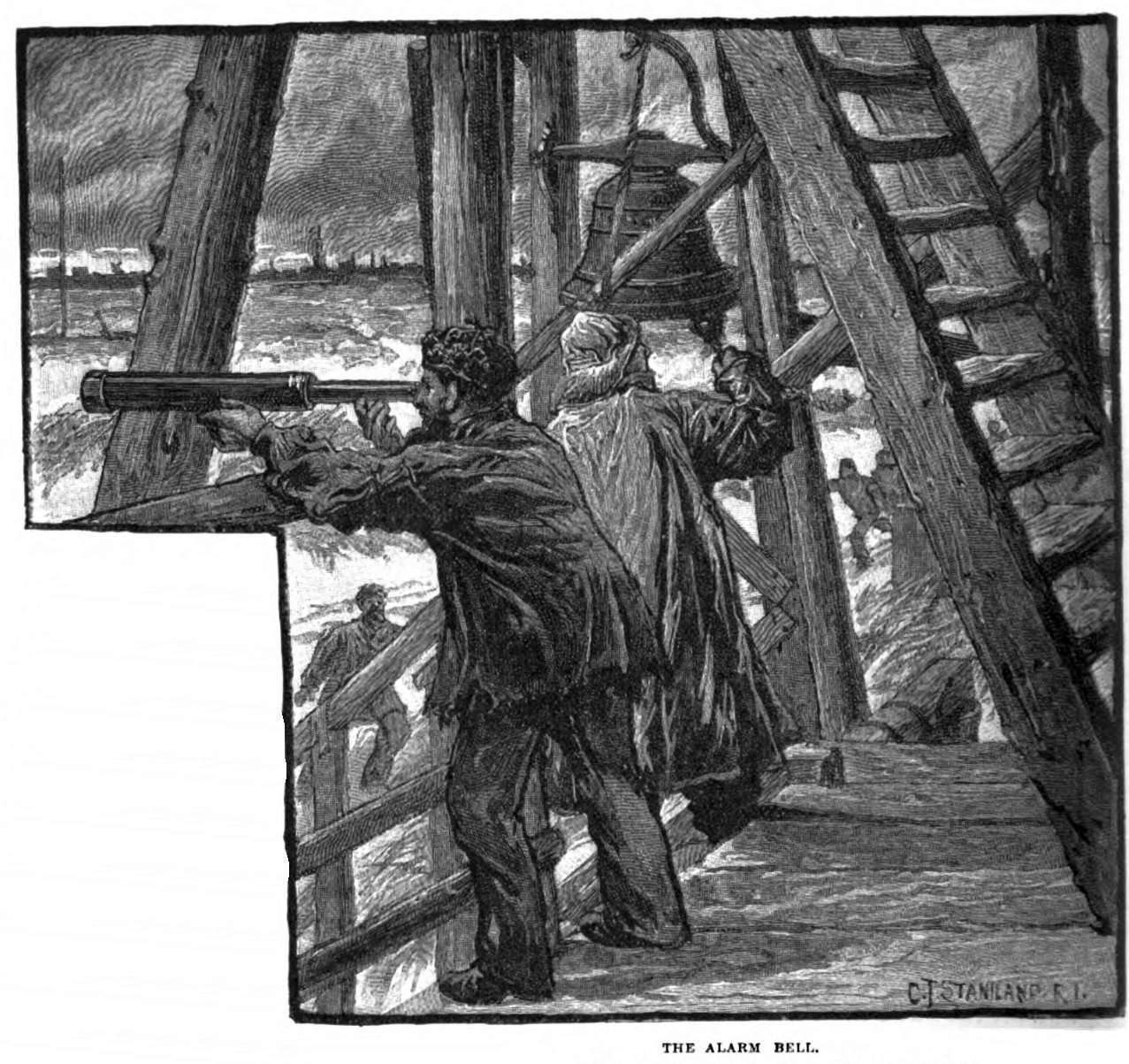
The Alarm Bell

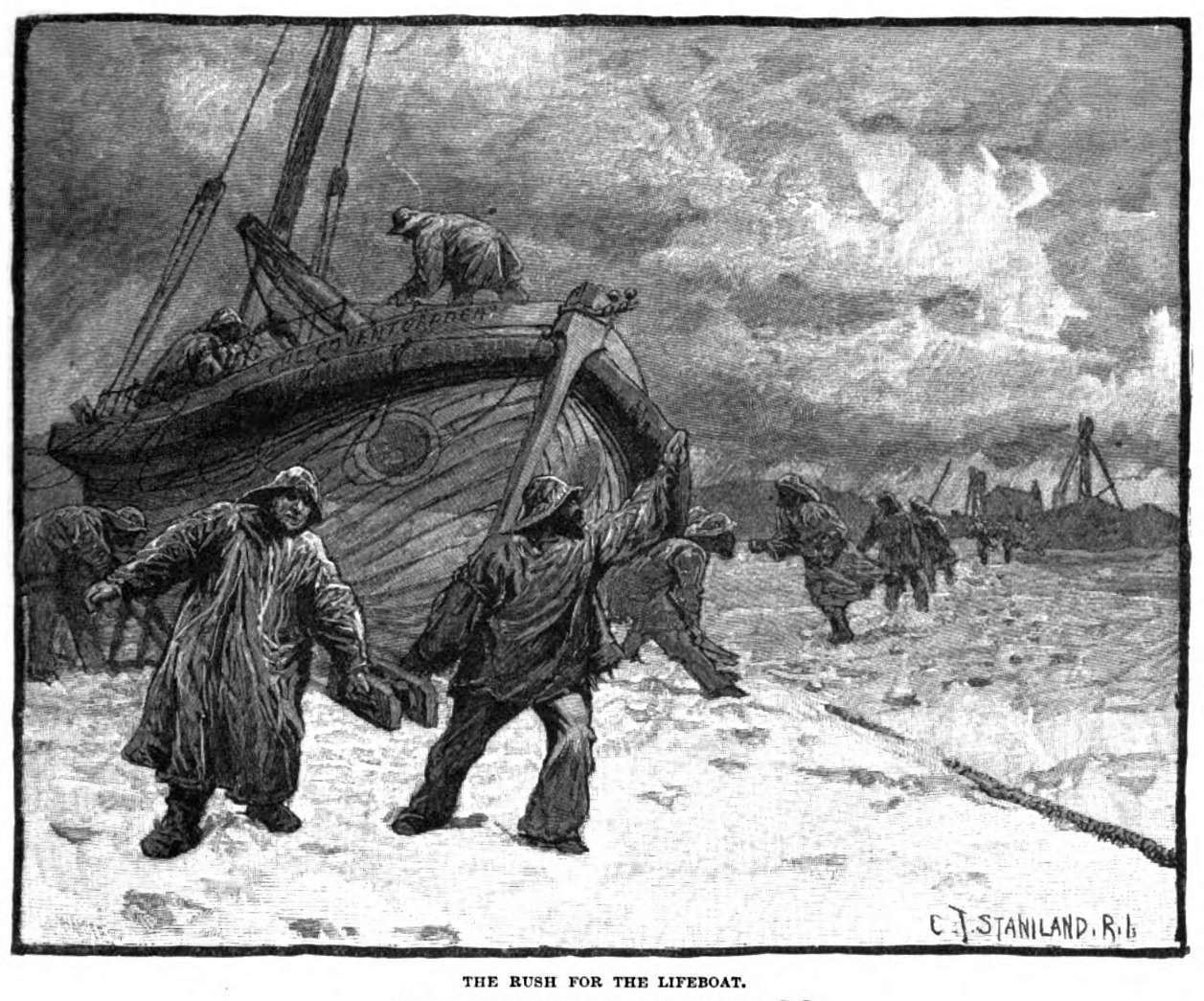
The Rush for the Lifeboat

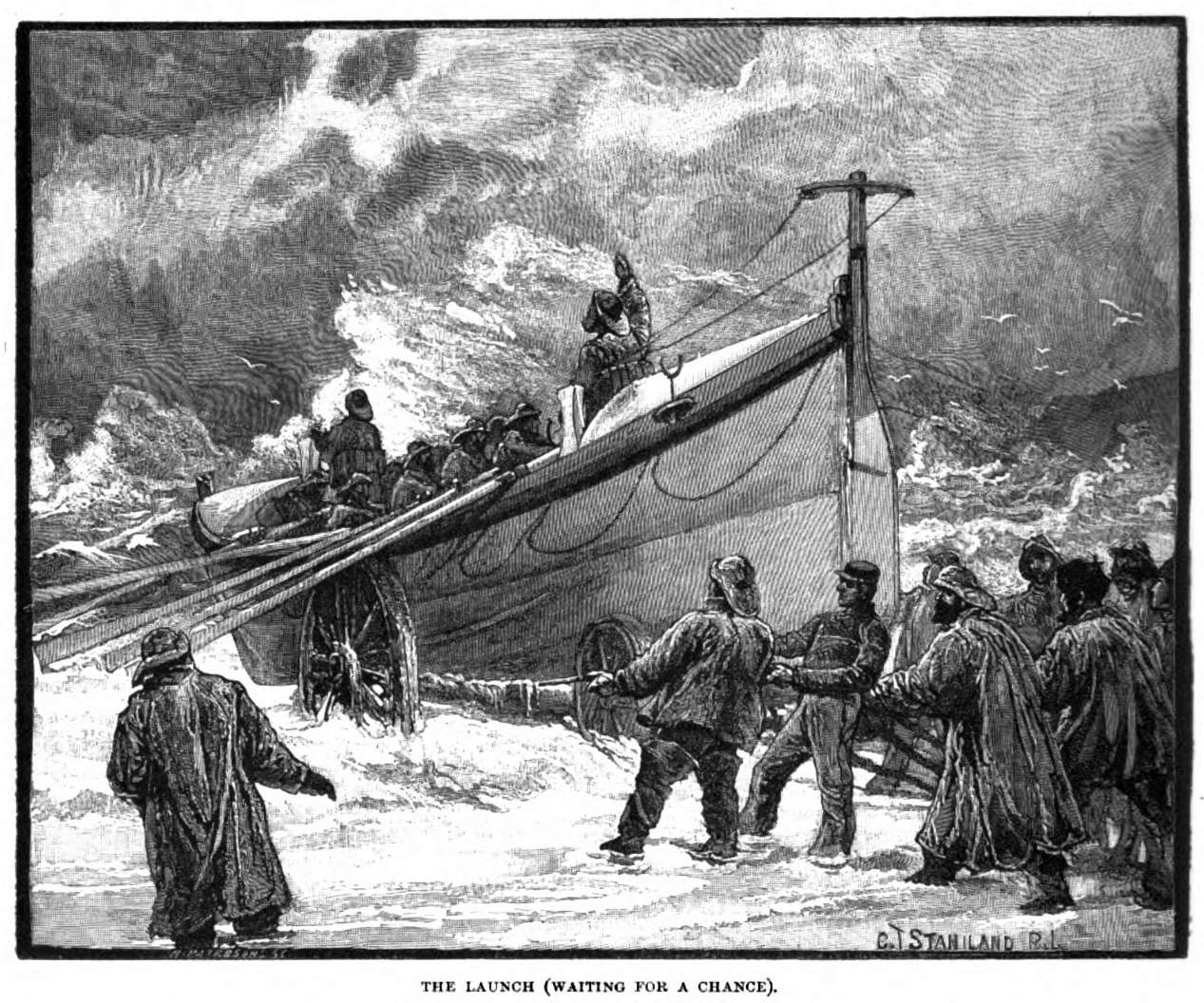
Waiting to Launch

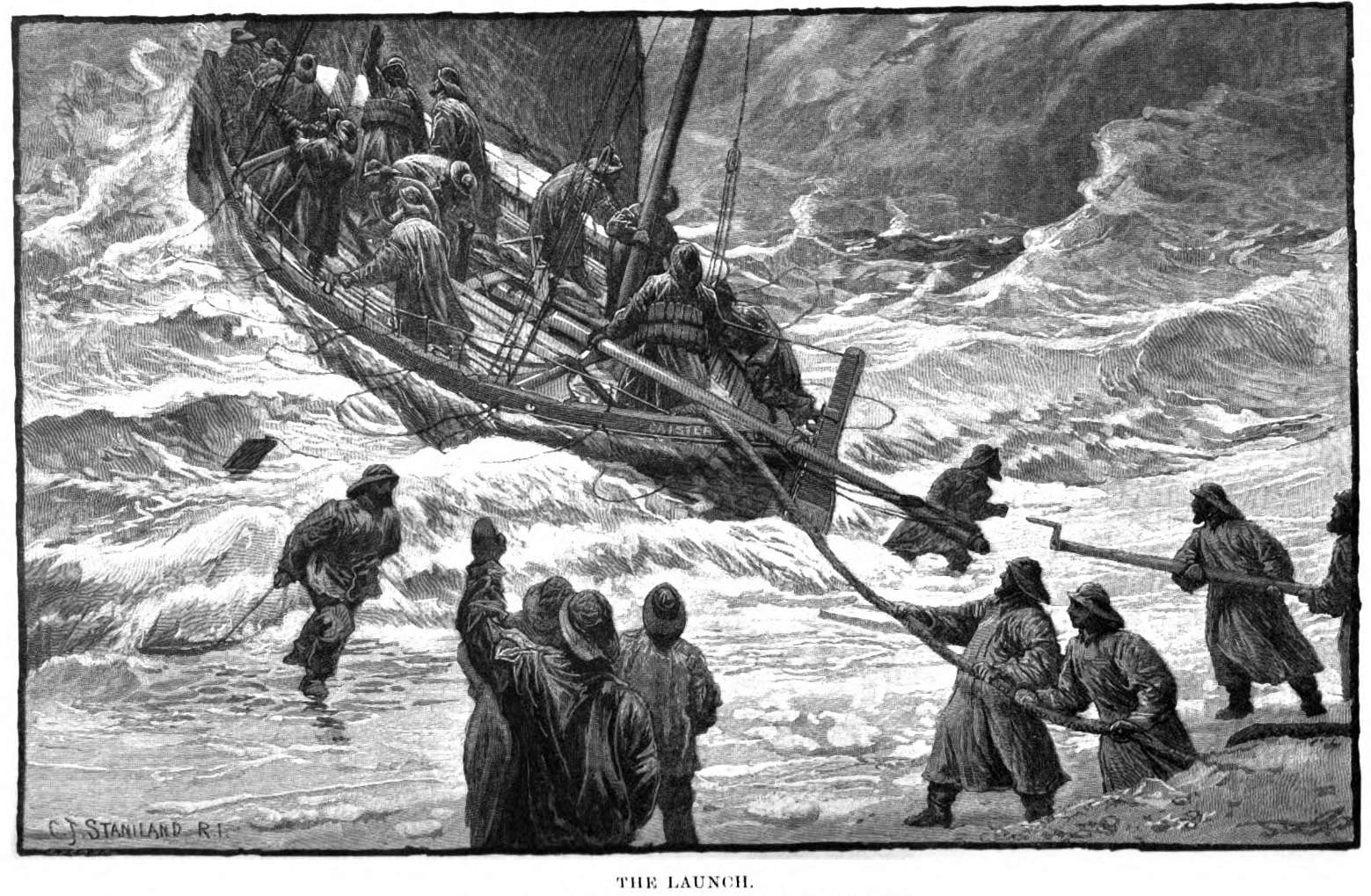
The Launch

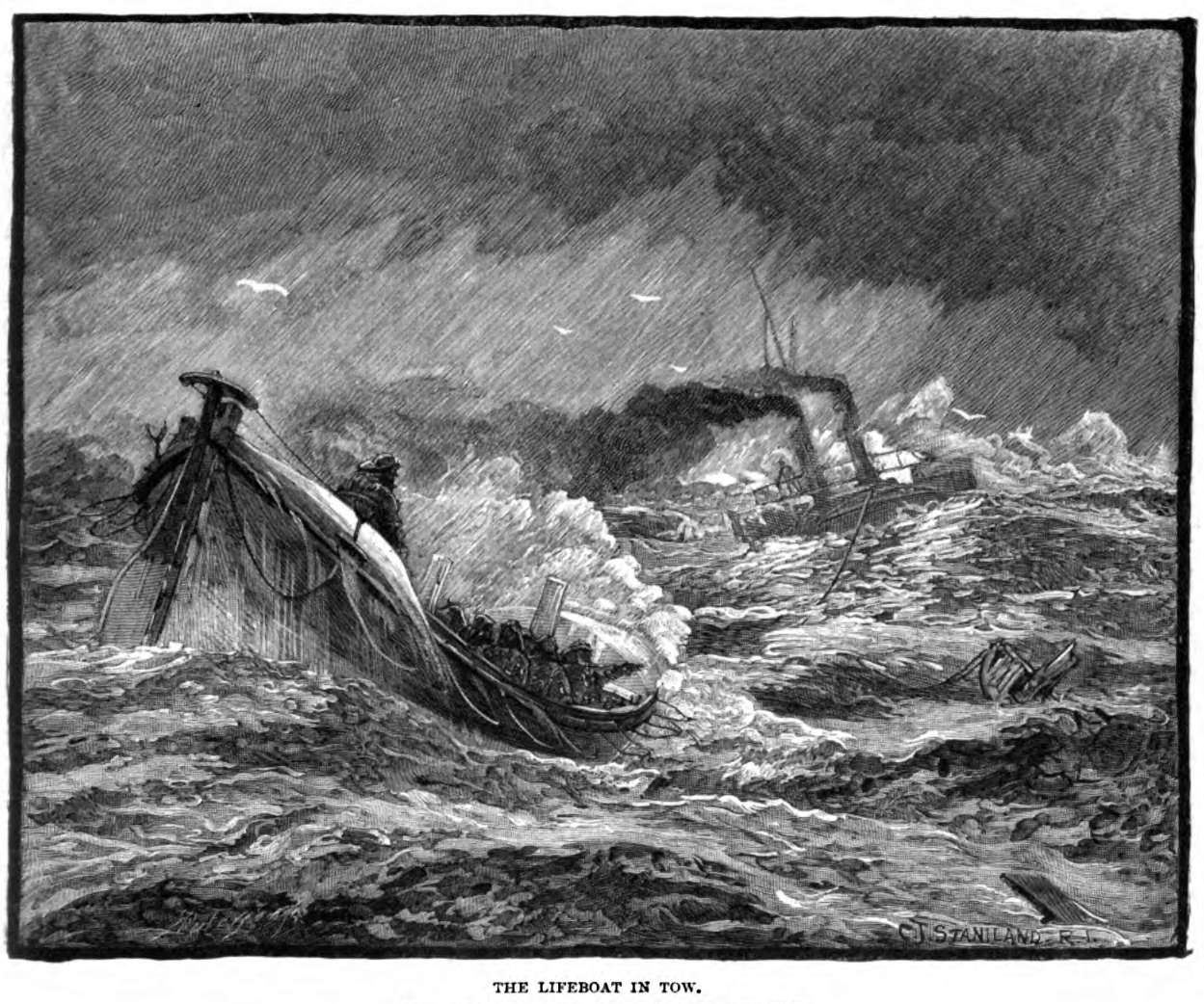
Lifeboat in Tow

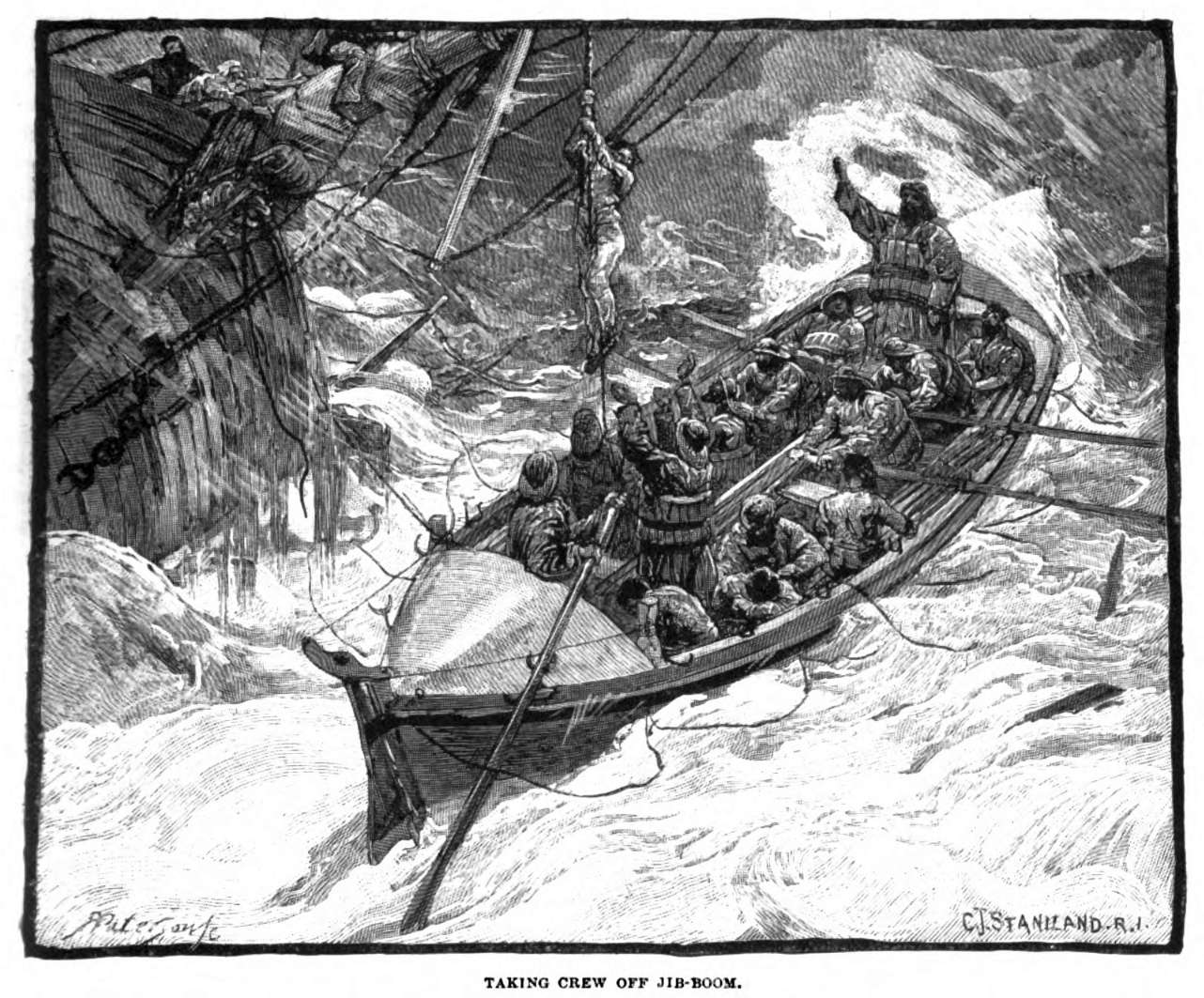
Taking the crew off by jib-boom

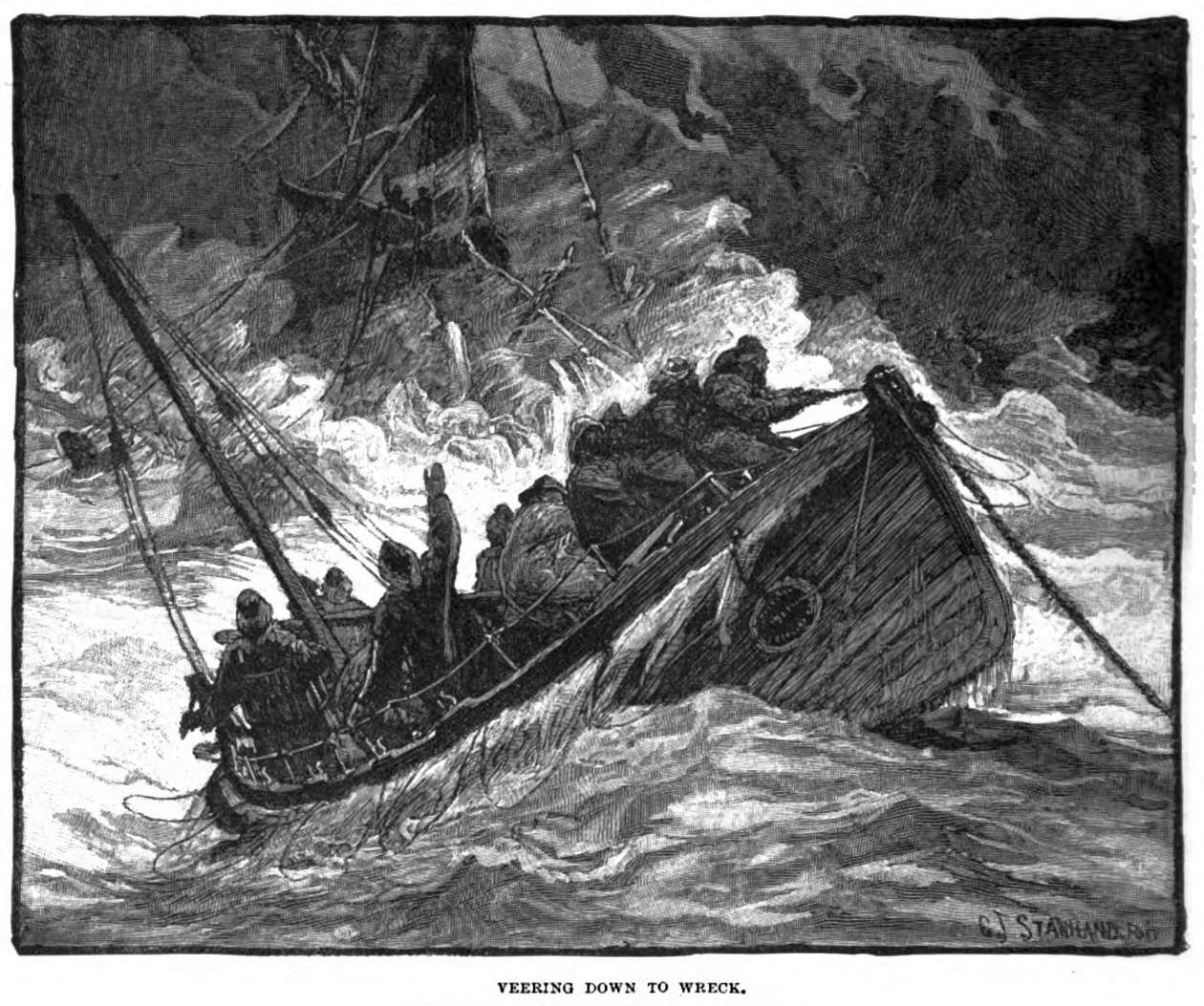
Veering down to the Wreck

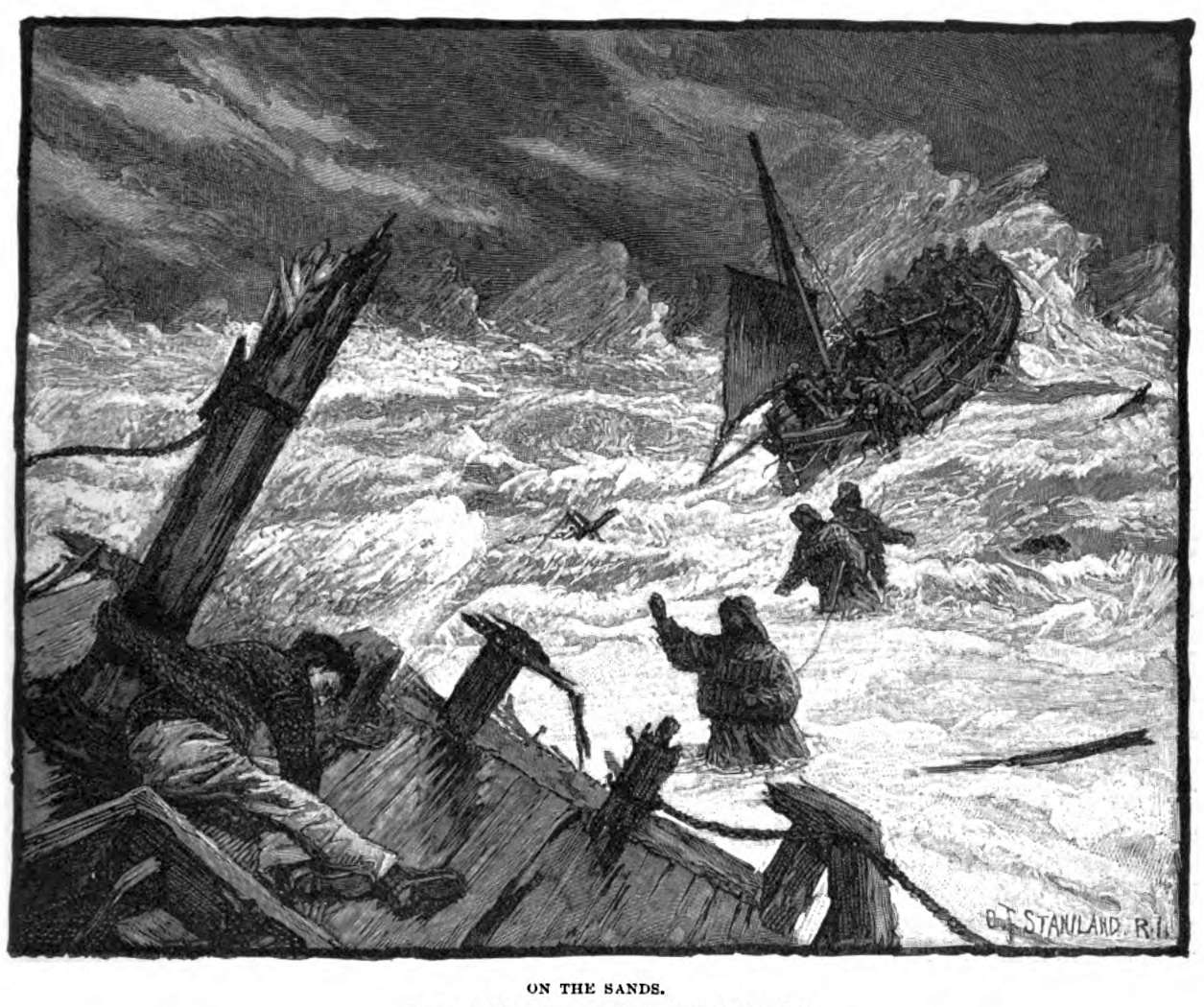
On the Sands

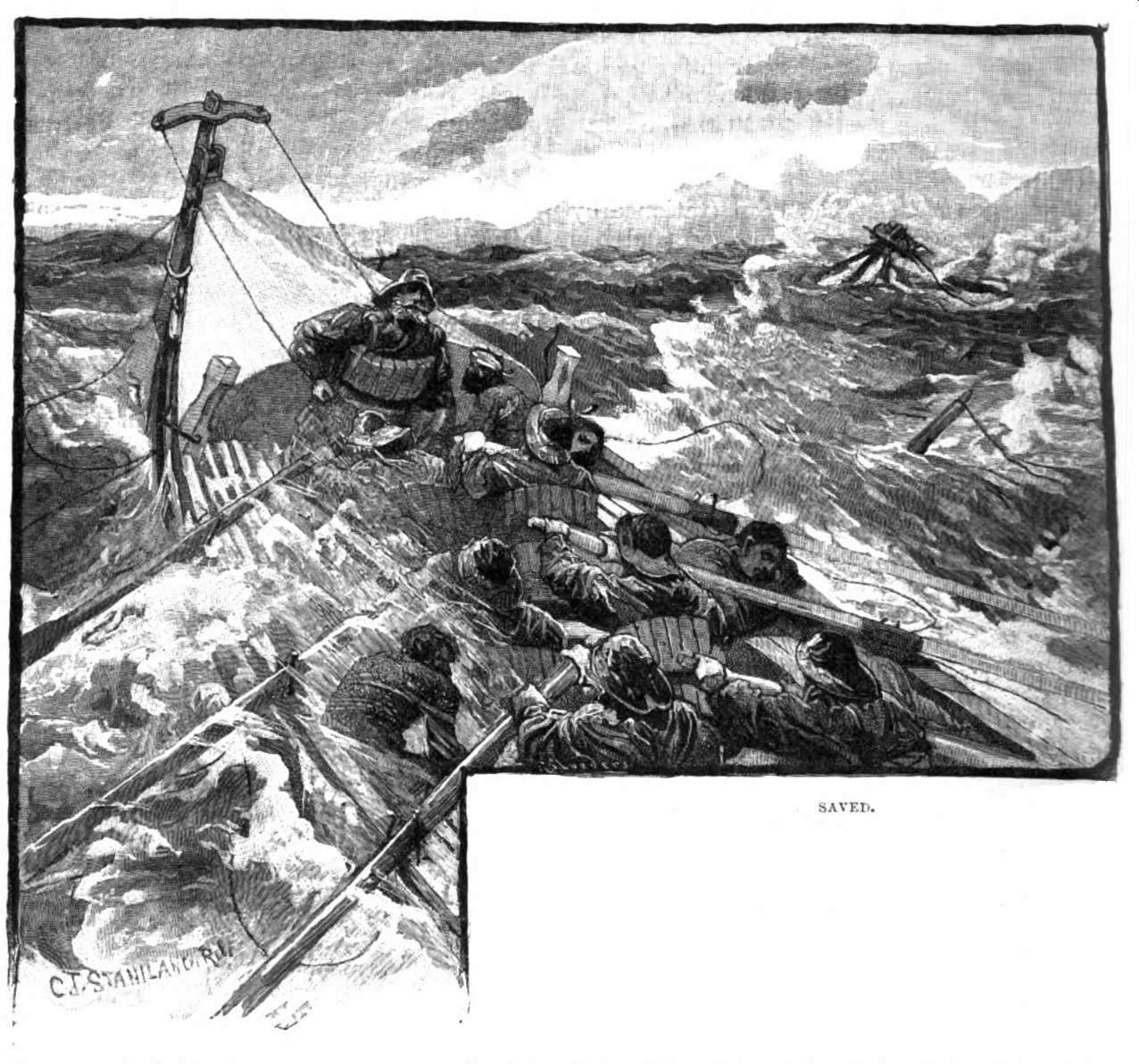
Saved

=== Book illustration ===
Kirkpatrick lists over 90 books illustrated by Staniland. Some of these were illustrated in collaboration with Wells.

Among the authors that Staniland illustrated for were:

- Hans Christian Andersen (1805–1875), a prolific Danish author best remembered for his fairy tales.
- Christabel Rose Coleridge (1843–1921), who wrote improving stories for children.
- Harry Collingwood (1843–1922), a writer of boys' adventure fiction, usually in a nautical setting.
- George Manville Fenn (1831–1909), a prolific author of fiction for young adults.
- Thomas Frost (1821–1908), an English radical journalist and writer.
- G. A. Henty (1832–1902), a prolific writer of boy's adventure fiction, often set in a historical context, who had himself served in the military and been a war correspondent.
- F.M. Holmes
- Ascott R. Hope (1846–1927), a prolific author of children's books, especially school stories, and of Black's Guides.
- W. H. G. Kingston (1814–1880), who wrote boy's adventure fiction.
- Emma Leslie (1838–1909), Emma Boultwood, wrote more than 100 books, mostly juvenile and historical titles with a Christian message.
- Frederick Marryat (1792–1848), a Royal Navy officer who wrote adventure books for children.
- Georgina Norway (1833–1915), who wrote adventure fiction for children as "G. Norway".
- Eliza F. Pollard (1839–1901), a polific author who turned to fiction in 1864 after a brief stint as a governess.
- Charles Napier Robinson (1849–1938), a Royal Naval officer who on retirement, became a journalist on naval matters and published the journal Navy and army illustrated : a magazine descriptive and illustrative of everyday life in the defensive service of the British Empire..
- Walter Scott (1771–1832), the Scottish historical novelist, poet, and historian who wrote Ivanhoe.
- Edward Whymper (1840–1911), an English explorer, mountaineer, illustrator, and author. Brother to Frederick Whymper.
- Charlotte Mary Yonge (1823–1901), who became a Sunday School teacher aged seven and remained one for the next seventy one years, she wrote to promote her religious views.

In 1886 Staniland illustrated The Dragon and The Raven, or The Days Of King Alfred. by George Alfred Henty (Blackie & Son, London 1886). The illustrations were made with line blocks from fine pen-drawings drawn in a manner that makes the picture look like wood-engravings.

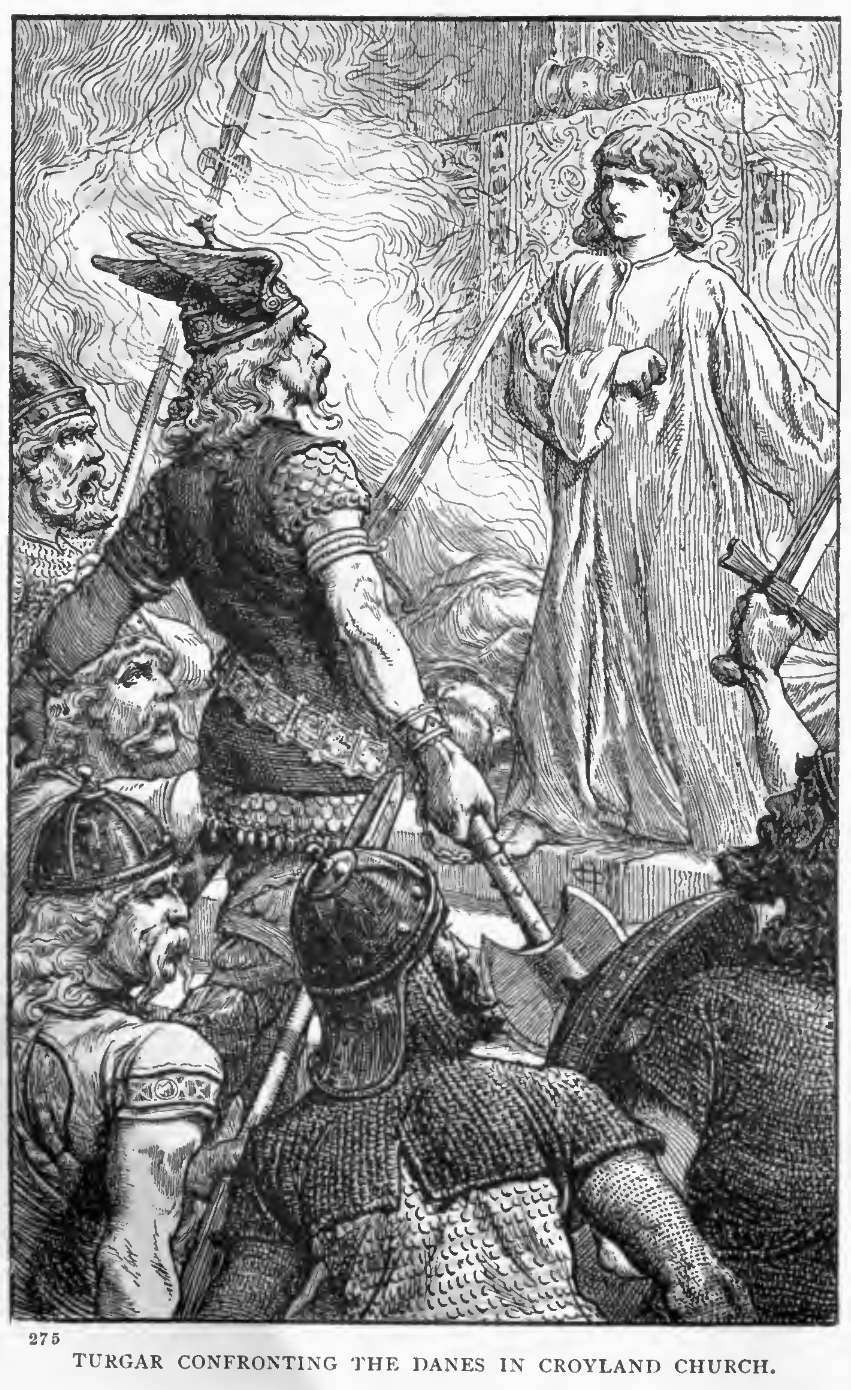
Confronting the Danes

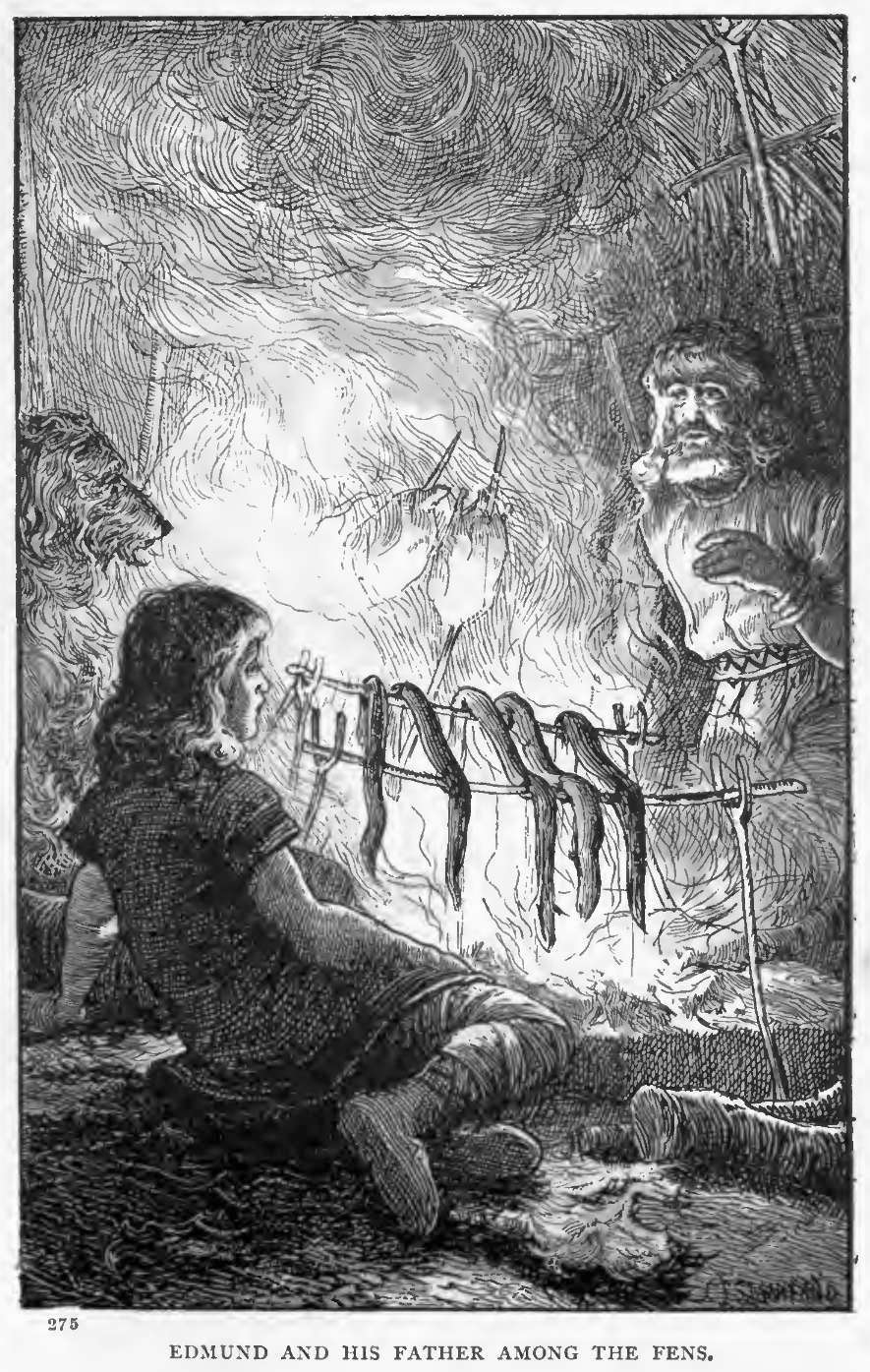
Cooking in the Hut

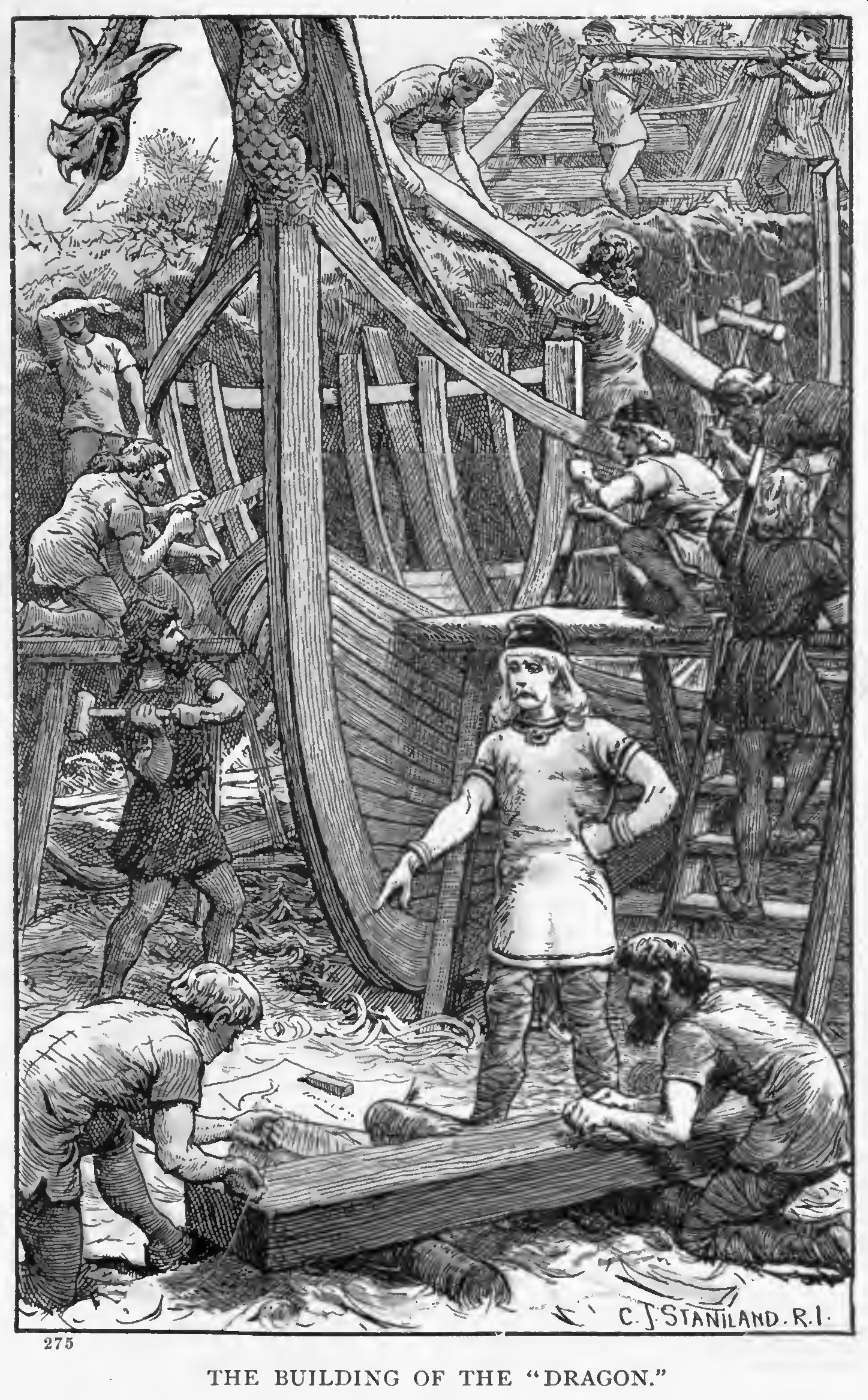
Building the Dragon

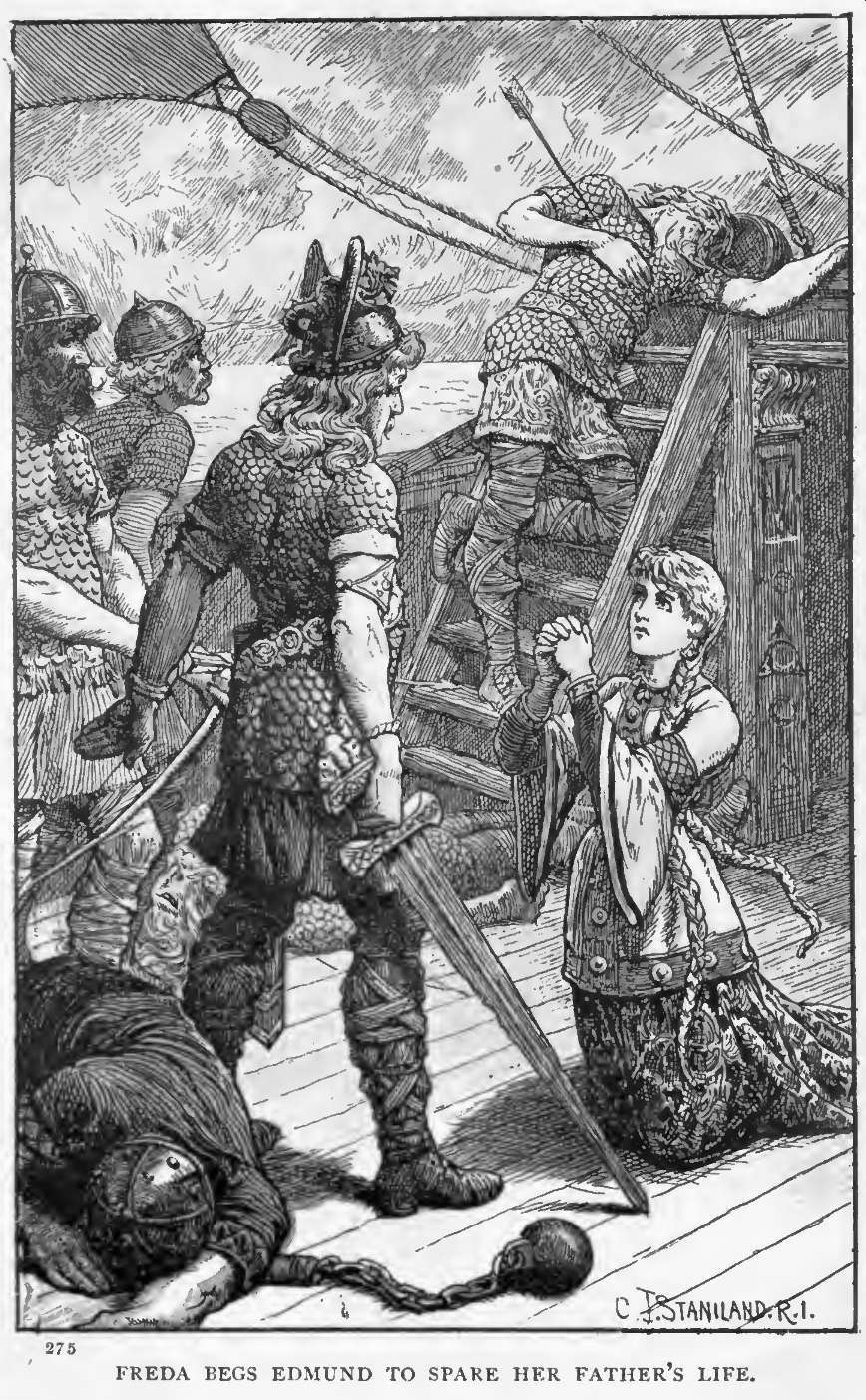
Freda Pleads for her Father's Life

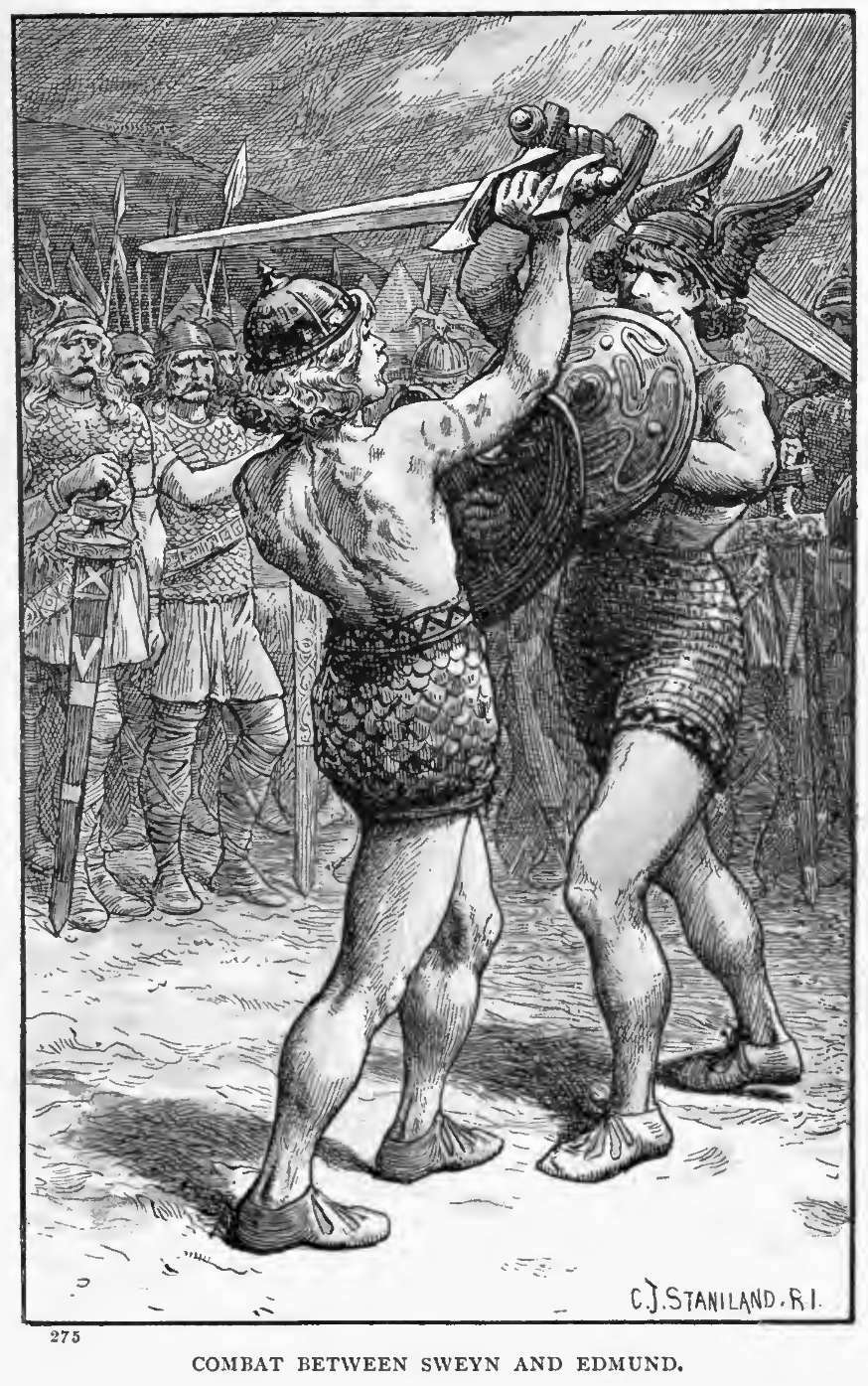
Combat between the Hero and Villain

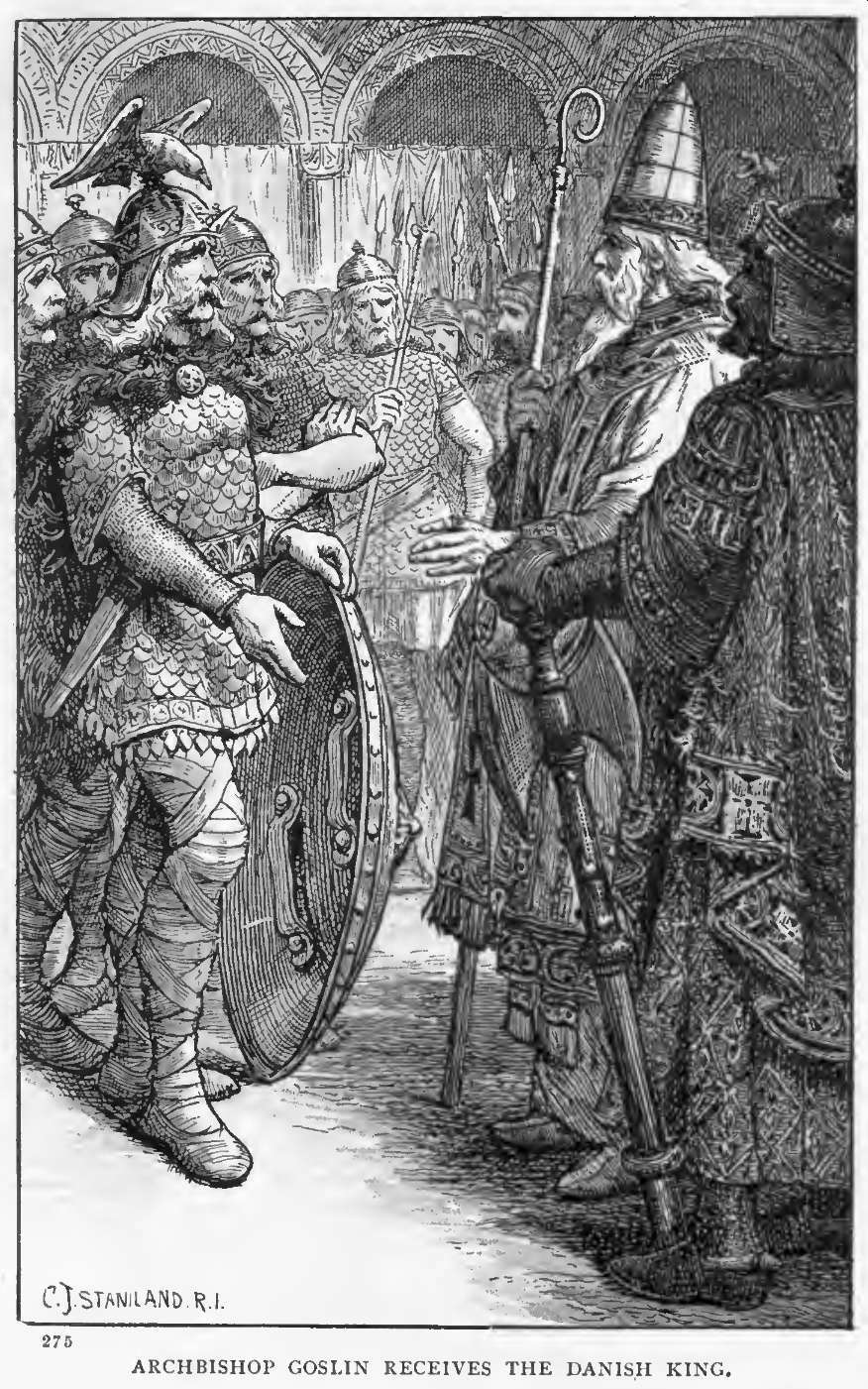
The Archbishop receives the king

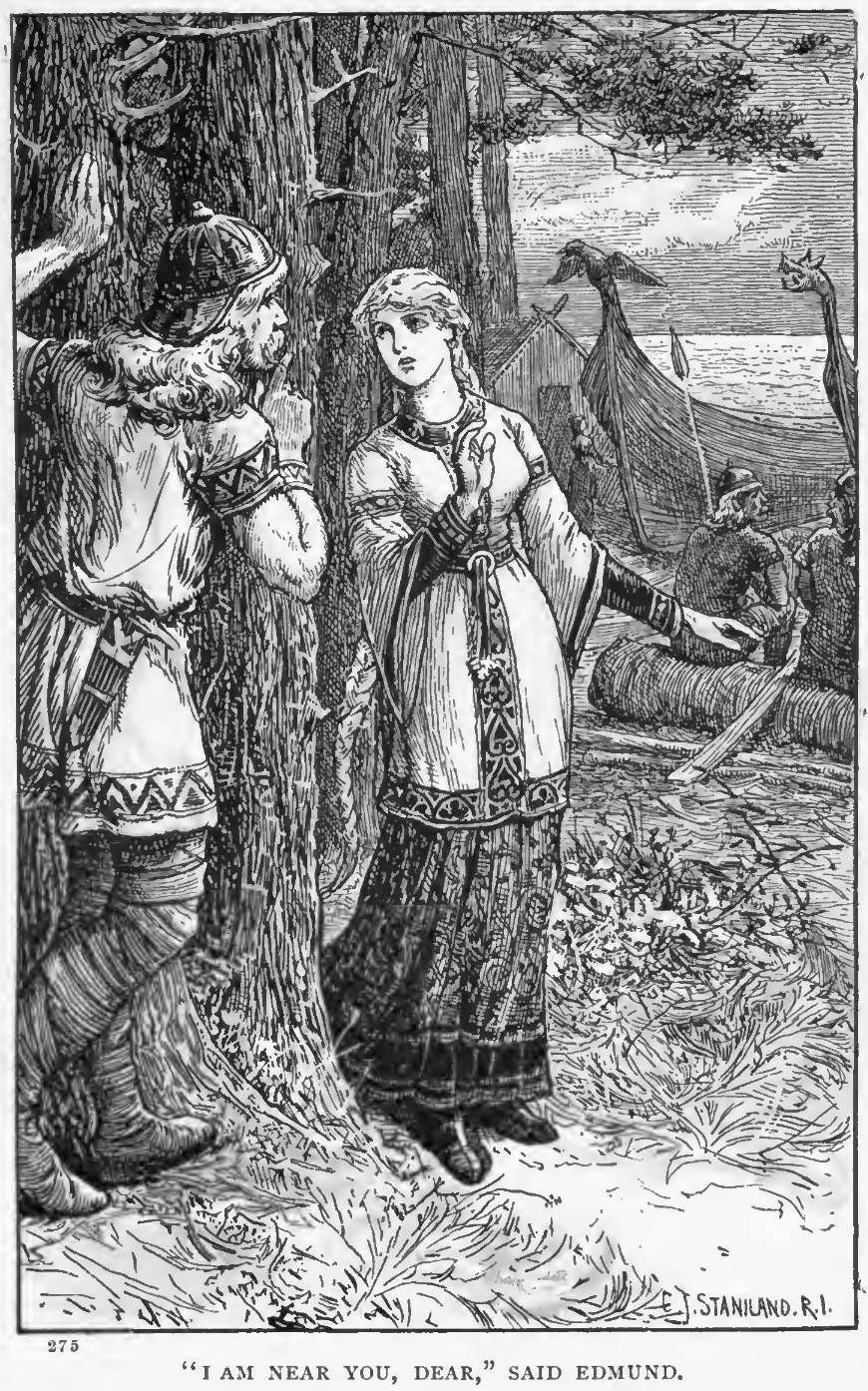
I am near you

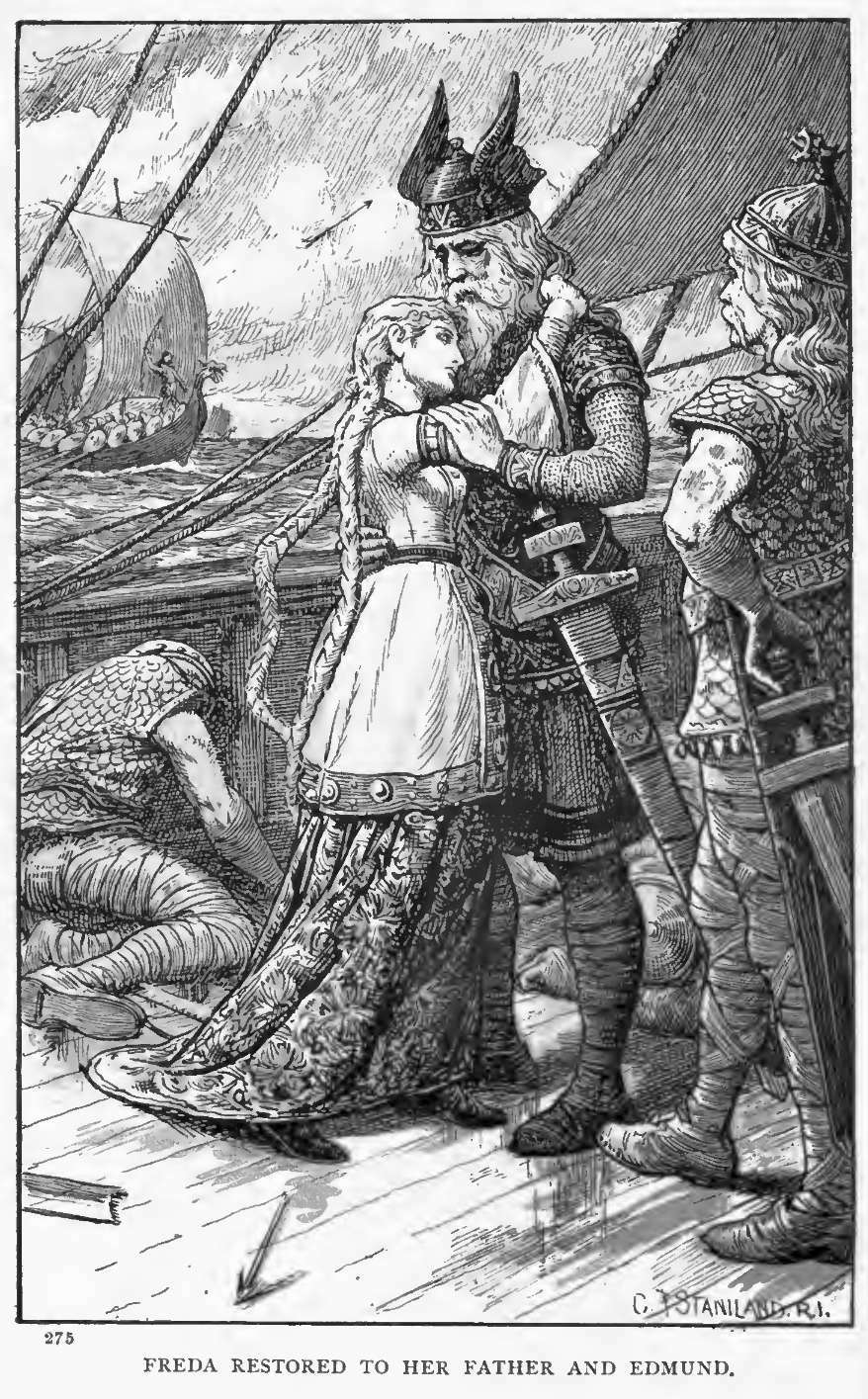
Freda Restored

== Assessment ==
Houfe states that "Staniland’s strength was in marine illustrations where the ships and tackle were seen at close quarters and the working seaman was observed in large scale" and that "His many contributions to The Illustrated London News and The Graphic were a mainstay of those periodicals in the 1870s and 1880s, readers had practically to wipe the brine from their faces as they turned the pages." The Hampstead and Highgate Express called him a "dextrous and humourous [sic]" artist.

Houfe also stated that Staniland "was also an excellent portrait artist and painted still-life and bird subjects in watercolour." His social realist images for the Graphic, particularly those of mining, were much admired by Van Gogh.

The best auction results for Staniland reported by Benezit are:

- London, 21 July 1887, The Lotus Eaters (1883, watercolour and pencil heightened with white, 75x122 cm) 4,800 GBP.
- London, 5 March 1993, At the Back of the Church (1876, pencil and watercolour, 151.1x91.6 cm) 8,050 GBP.
- London, 6 Nov 1996, The Dutch Delegation Offering the Crown of Holland to Henri III of France (1884, oil on canvas, 106.5x184 cm) 10,120 GBP. The same piece had sold for 5,500 GBP in London 13 years earlier on 19 Oct 1983. (Note: Staniland had registered his copyright of this work on 26 April 1882, presumably with a view to the production of prints.) (Note: In its review of The Dutch Envoy offer the Crown of the Netherlands to Henri III of France the Liverpool Mercury states that the scene is based on an incident related in John Lothrop Motley's The United Netherlands (Note: The incident is described on page 96 of Volume I of Motley's book. However, Motley states that, unlike the painting, where the Dutch Envoys were received in open court, they were in fact received in the King's cabinet, where he was accompanied only by the Duke of Joyeuse, the Count of Bouscaige, M. de Valette, and the Count of Château Vieux. Motley describes the basket of puppies. Henry declined the offer of the crown, and the envoys left disheartened after three months of negotiations.) The Mercury describes the picture thus: "The composition consists of twenty-seven figures, the central group consisting of the blasé and frivolous King and his courtiers. The former is amusing himself with a litter of puppies which are in a basket and slung round his neck. . . The contrast between the frivolous and effeminate King and his court, compared with the stern countenances of the Dutch envoys, one of whom is reading an address, constitute the point of the picture." The Mercury was full of praise for the painting: "There are some good grouping and clever figure-painting in this picture, and the accessories particularly are worked out and painted with great care.")
