= Max Pemberton =

English novelist and publisher

Sir Max Pemberton
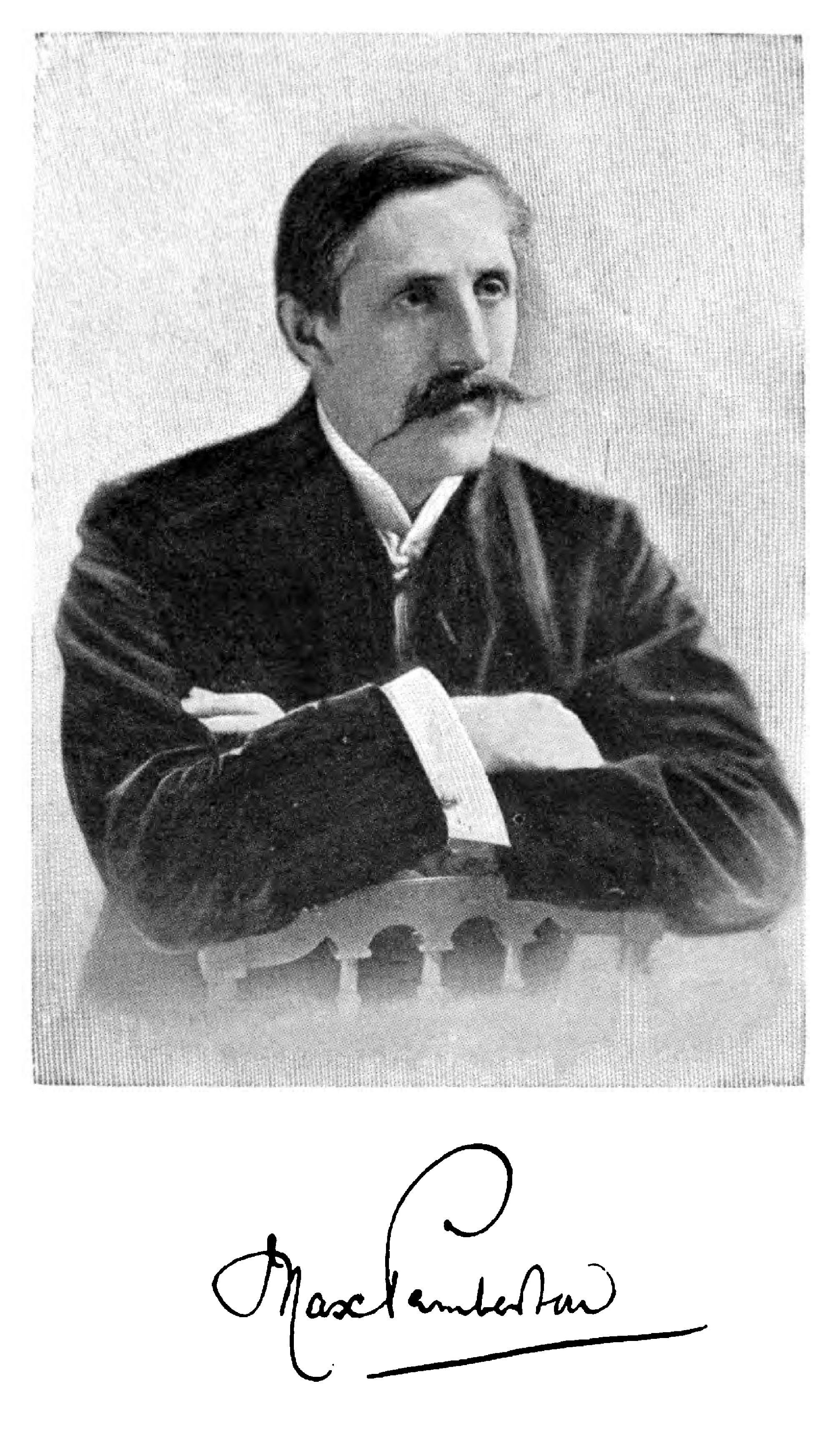
- c. 1895
- Born: 19 June 1863; Paddington, London, England
- Died: 22 February 1950 (aged 86); London, England
- Education: Merchant Taylors' School; Caius College, Cambridge.
- Occupations: Journalist and author
- Spouses: Alice Agnes Tussaud (m. 1885; div. 1924): Joan Berrill
- Writing career
- Notable work: The Iron Pirate
- Notable awards: Knight Bachelor

Sir Max Pemberton JP (19 June 1863 – 22 February 1950) was a popular English mystery and adventure novelist, biographer and publisher. He was also a prolific editor and worked for various popular periodicals and magazines including Chums and Cassell's Magazine.

== Life ==
Max Pemberton was born in Paddington on 19 June 1863. (Note: He sometimes gave his place of birth as Edgbaston, Birmingham (his mother was from Birmingham).) He was educated at St Albans School, Merchant Taylors' School, and Caius College, Cambridge. A clubman, journalist and dandy (Lord Northcliffe admired his "fancy vests"), he frequented both Fleet Street and The Savage Club.

Pemberton married Alice Tussaud, who was the granddaughter of Madame Marie Tussaud, on 9 February 1885. They had seven children together. In 1924, she was granted a divorce under the previous year's Matrimonial Causes Act, alleging that Max had begun living with another woman, Joan Berrill, in 1913. Pemberton subsequently remarried to Berrill.

== Works ==
Pemberton's most famous work The Iron Pirate became a best-seller after it was published in 1893 and it initiated his prolific writing career. This is a story about a great gas-driven iron-clad, which could outpace the navies of the world and terrorised the shipping of the Atlantic Ocean. The following year, Pemberton's collection of stories titled the Jewel Mysteries I Have Known: From a Dealer's Note Book was published. This is a series of Mystery stories that each revolve around stolen jewels.

Between 1896 and 1906, Pemberton edited Cassell's Magazine, in which capacity he published the early works of R. Austin Freeman and William Le Queux. He also wrote historical fiction including I Crown Thee King (1902), which is set in Sherwood Forest during the time of Mary I.

During January 1908, and just one year after the death of Pemberton's friend and fellow Crimes Club member, Bertram Fletcher Robinson, he had a story titled Wheels of Anarchy published by Cassell. This book includes the following book dedication in the form of an "Author's Note":

This story was suggested to me by the late B. Fletcher Robinson,
deeply mourned. The subject was one in which he had interested himself for
some years; and almost the last message I had from him expressed the desire
that I would keep my promise and treat of the idea in a book. This I have now
done, adding something of my own to the brief notes he left me, but chiefly
bringing to the task an enduring gratitude for a friendship which nothing can
replace.

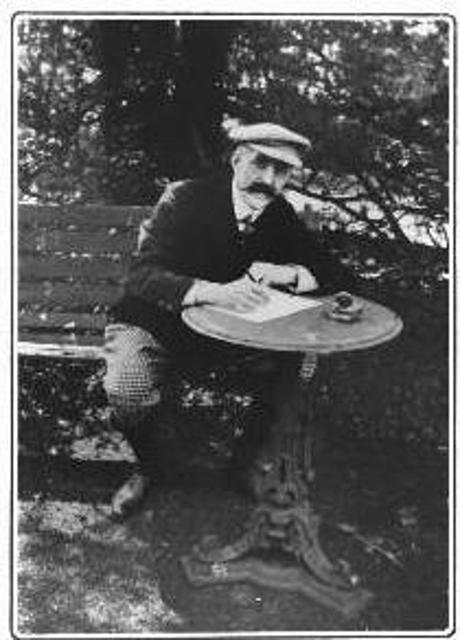
"I'm essentially an outdoor man." c. 1903

The Wheels of Anarchy is an adventure tale about anarchists and assassins, which is set across Continental Europe. The novel's hero, Bruce Driscoll, is a recent graduate of Jesus College, Cambridge and he appears to be modelled upon Robinson. In December 2010, Wheels of Anarchy by Max Pemberton was compiled, introduced and republished in facsimile form by Paul Spiring and Hugh Cooke.

Pemberton's novels Beatrice of Venice (1904) and Paulina (1922) centre on Napoleon's military campaigns in Italy. Other notable works included Captain Black (1911) and Father Brown story titled The Donnington Affair by G. K. Chesterton in an obscure British periodical named The Premier (1914). This short story was reprinted in the Chesterton Review in 1981.

In 1920, Pemberton founded the London School of Journalism, and wrote a biography about Alfred Harmsworth, 1st Viscount Northcliffe. Pemberton also wrote a biography about Sir Henry Royce, which was published in 1934 shortly after Royce's death.

== Death ==
Pemberton died at his home in London on 22 February 1950. He was buried at St Mary's Catholic Cemetery, Kensal Green.

== Honours ==
Pemberton was knighted in the 1928 Birthday Honours, gazetted on 1 June 1928.

== Selected bibliography ==
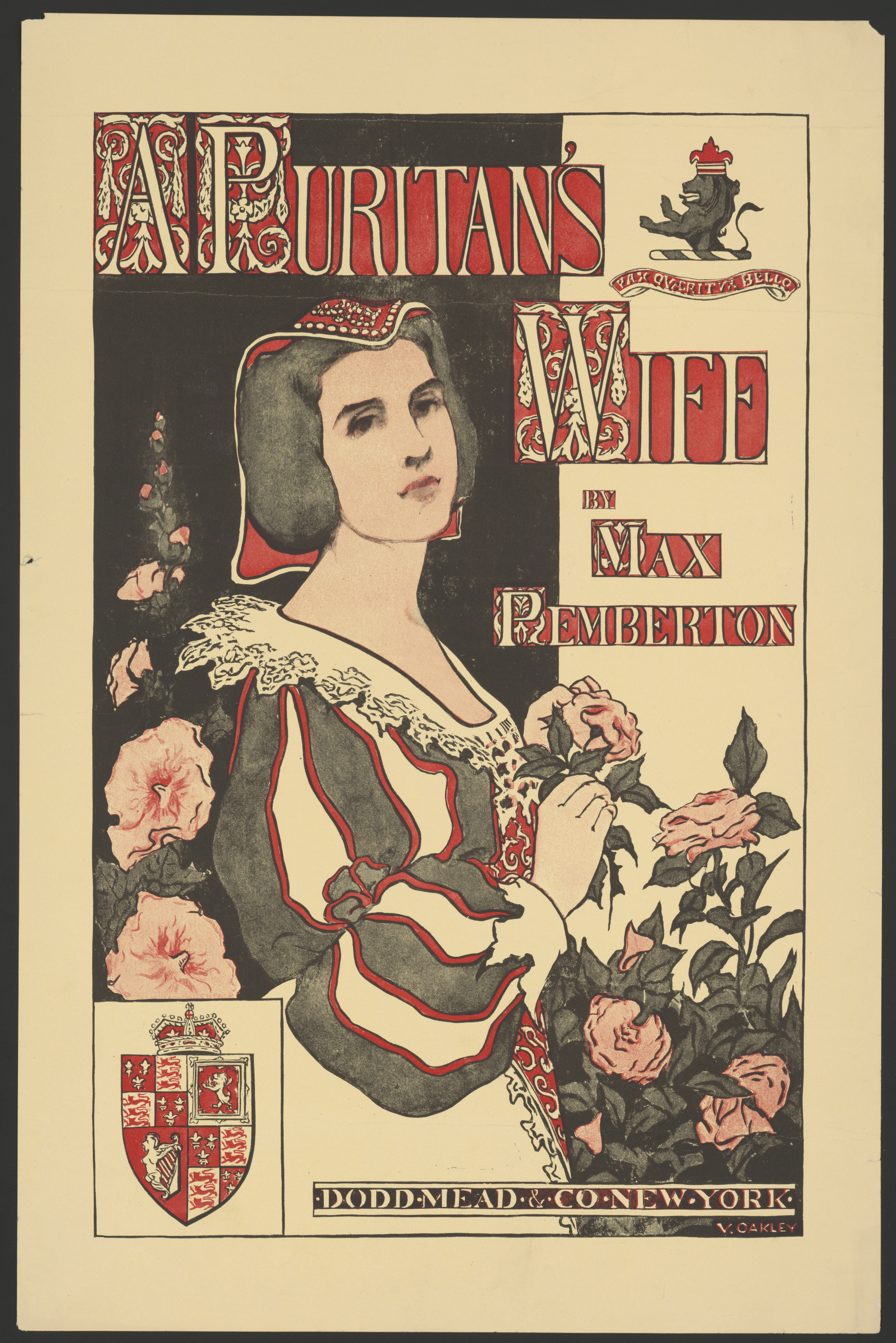
Cover of A Puritan's Wife (1902)

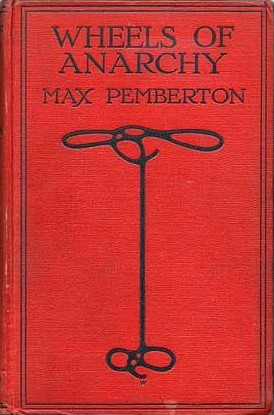
Wheels of Anarchy (1908)

- The Iron Pirate (1893)
- The Sea Wolves (1894)
- Jewel Mysteries I have Known. From a Dealer's Note Book (1894)
- The Impregnable City (1895)
- The Little Huguenot: A Romance of Fountainebleau (1895)
- A Gentleman's Gentleman (1896)
- Christine of the Hills (1897)
- The Phantom Army (1898)
- A Woman of Kronstadt (1898)
- The Signors of the Night: The Story of Fra Giovanni (1899)
- Féo (1900)
- The Footsteps of a Throne... (1901)
- The Giant's Gate: A Story of a Great Adventure (1901)
- Pro Patriâ (1901)
- I Crown Thee King (1902)
- The Garden of Swords (1902)
- The House Under the Sea (1902)
- A Puritan's Wife (1902)
- Doctor Xavier (1903)
- The Gold Wolf (1903)
- Beatrice of Venice (1904)
- A Daughter of the States (1904)
- Red Morn (1904)
- Mid the Thick Arrows (1905)
- The Lady Evelyn (1906)
- My Sword for Lafayette (1906)
- Aladdin of London or, Lodestar (1907)
- The Amateur Motorist (1907)
- The Diamond Ship (1907)
- Love, the Harvester: A Story of the Shires (1908)
- Sir Richard Escombe (1908)
- Wheels of Anarchy, the Story of an Assassin (1908)
- The Adventures of Captain Jack (1909)
- The Mystery of the Green Heart (1910)
- The Show Girl (1910)
- White Walls (1910)
- Captain Black: A Romance of the Nameless Ship (1911)
- White Motley (1911)
- The Hundred Days (1912)
- Swords Reluctant (1912)
- Two Women (1914)

== Sources ==
- New General Catalog of Old Books and Authors
