= George Manville Fenn =

English writer and educationalist (1831–1909)

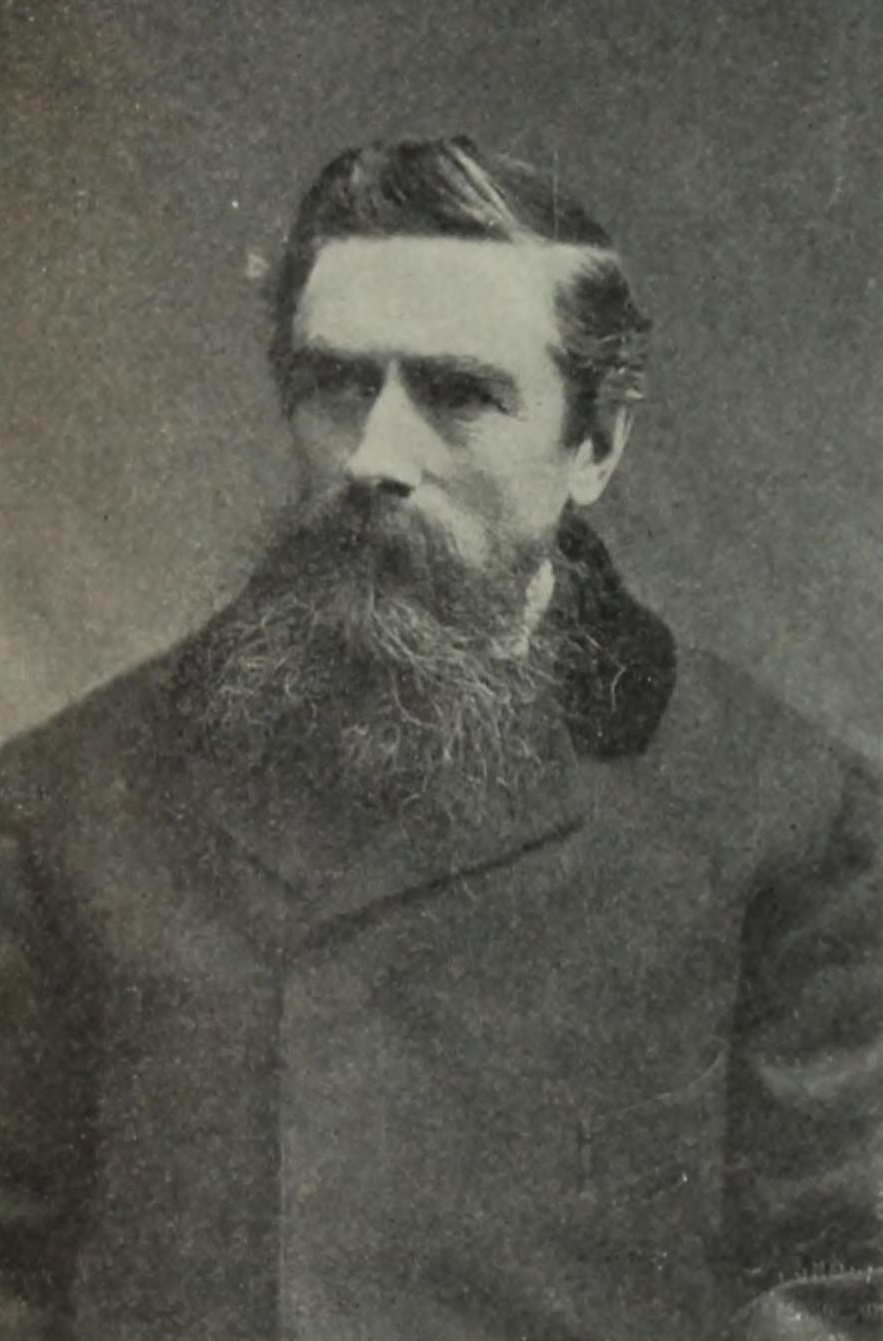
- Born: 3 January 1831; Pimlico, UK
- Died: 26 August 1909 (aged 78); Isleworth, UK
- Education: Battersea Training College
- Writing career
- Genre: boys' stories
- Notable work: The Fenn Books

George Manville Fenn (3 January 1831 in Pimlico – 26 August 1909 in Isleworth) was a prolific English novelist, journalist, editor and educationalist. Many of his novels were written with young adults in mind. His final book was his biography of a fellow writer for juveniles, George Alfred Henty.

== Life and works ==
Fenn, the third child and eldest son of a butler, Charles Fenn, was largely self-educated, teaching himself French, German and Italian. After studying at Battersea Training College for teachers (1851–1854), he became the master of a national school at Alford, Lincolnshire.

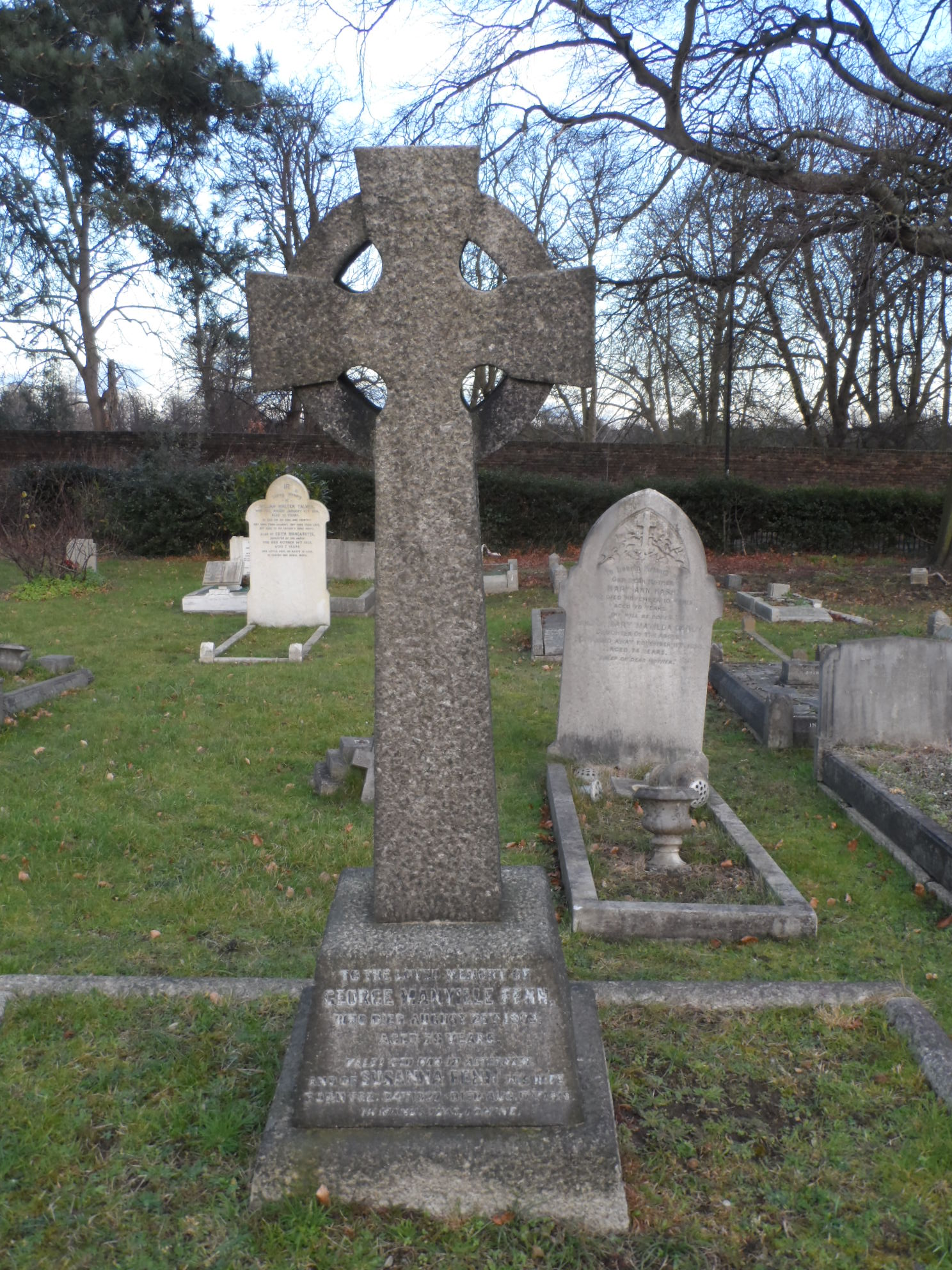
Grave of George Manville Fenn in Isleworth Cemetery

Fenn later became a printer, editor and publisher of some short-lived periodicals, before attracting the attention of Charles Dickens and others with a sketch for All the Year Round in 1864. He contributed to Chambers's Journal and to the magazine Once a Week. In 1866, he wrote a series of articles on working-class life for the newspaper The Star. These works were collected and republished in four volumes, followed by a similar series in the Weekly Times.

Fenn's first story for boys, Hollowdell Grange, appeared in 1867. It was followed by a succession of other novels for juveniles and adults. The Star-Gazers (1894), for example, was a three-volume "astronomical romance" for adults. Having become the editor of Cassell's Magazine in 1870, Fenn then purchased Once a Week and edited it until it closed in 1879. He also wrote for the theatre. Fenn authored many historical fiction novels, including Crown and Sceptre: A West-Country Story (1889) about the English Civil War, Ned Ledger (1899), focusing on naval combat during War of the Austrian Succession, The King's Sons (1901) about King Alfred, and Marcus, the Young Centurion (1904), about Julius Caesar.

Fenn and his family lived at Syon Lodge, Isleworth, Middlesex, where he built up a library of 25,000 volumes and took up telescope making. His last book was a biography of a great fellow writer of boys' stories, George Alfred Henty.

== Family ==
In 1855, George Manville Fenn married Susanna Leake; they had two sons and six daughters. He died at his home on 26 August 1909.

== Fenn's works ==
=== Novels ===
1. Cabby (1864)
2. Hollowdell Grange (1866)
3. Webs in the Way (1867)
4. Bent, Not Broken (3 vols, 1867)
5. Mad (1868)
6. By Birth a Lady (1871)
7. The Sapphire Cross (1871)
8. Thereby Hangs a Tale (1876)
9. A Little World (1877, reprinted 1882 as Poverty Corner: A City Story)
10. The Chemist, 64-page story for March issue of Once a Week
11. Pretty Polly (3 vols, 1878)
12. The Parson o' Dumford (1879)
13. The Clerk of Portwick (1880)
14. Bunyip Land (1880)
15. Off to the Wilds (1880)
16. Devon Boys (1880)
17. The Vicar's People (1881)
18. Eli's Children (1882)
19. Dutch the Diver (1883)
20. Middy and Ensign (1883)
21. Nat the Naturalist (1883)
22. Son Philip (1883)
23. The Silver Cañon (1884)
24. The Golden Magnet (1884)
25. Sweet Mace (1884)
26. The Rosery Folk (1884)
27. Through Forest and Stream: The Quest of the Quetzal (1884)
28. The Dark House (1885)
29. Morgan's Horror (1885)
30. Eve At the Wheel (1885)
31. Menhardoc (1885)
32. Dick o' the Fens (1885)
33. A Terrible Coward (1885)
34. The New Forest Spy: a Tale of a Lost Cause (1885)
35. Patience Wins (1886)
36. Brownsmith's Boy (1886)
37. The Master of the Ceremonies (1886)
38. The Chaplain's Craze (1886)
39. Double Cunning (1886)
40. The Bag of Diamonds (1887)
41. One Maid's Mischief (1887)
42. This Man's Wife (1887)
43. Yussuf the Guide (1887)
44. Quicksilver (1888)
45. Mother Carey's Chicken (1888)
46. The Man With a Shadow (1888)
47. The Story of Antony Grace, or, Some Stained Pages (1887)
48. Commodore Junk (1888)
49. Of High Descent (1889)
50. The Lass That Loved a Soldier (1889)
51. Three People's Secret (1889)
52. Crown and Sceptre: A West Country Story (c. 1889)
53. Three Boys, or The Chiefs of the Clan Mackhai (1889)
54. In the King's Name (1890)
55. Cormorant Crag (1890)
56. Will of the Mill (1890)
57. The Adventures of Don Lavington (1890)
58. Cutlass and Cudgel (1890)
59. Mass' George (1890)
60. Charge! (1890)
61. Lady Maude's Mania (1890)
62. The Mynns' Mystery (1890)
63. A Double Knot (1890)
64. A Fluttered Dovecote (1890)
65. The New Mistress (1891)
66. Mahme Nousie (1891)
67. The Crystal Hunters (1891)
68. Burr Junior (1891)
69. The Rajah of Dah (1891)
70. To the West (1891)
71. Syd Belton (1891)
72. The Weathercock (1892)
73. The Dingo Boys (1892)
74. Gil the Gunner (1892)
75. King of the Castle (1892)
76. The Grand Chaco (1892)
77. Witness to the Deed (1893)
78. A Sylvan Courtship (1893)
79. Nurse Elisia (1893)
80. Sail-Ho! (1893)
81. Steve Young (1893)
82. The Black Bar (1893)
83. Blue Jackets: The Log of the Teaser (1893)
84. A Life's Eclipse (1894)
85. First In the Field (1894)
86. Fire Island (1894)
87. The Star-Gazers (1894)
88. The White Virgin (1894)
89. Real Gold (1894)
90. The Vast Abyss (1894)
91. The Tiger Lily (1894)
92. In an Alpine Valley (1894)
93. An Electric Spark (1895)
94. The Queen's Scarlet (1895)
95. Planter Jack (1895)
96. In Honour's Cause (1896)
97. The Black Tor (1896)
98. Sappers and Miners (1896)
99. Jack At Sea; or All Work and No Play Made Him a Dull Boy (1896)
100. Cursed By a Fortune (1896)
101. The Case of Ailsa Gray (1896)
102. Smith's Weakness (1896)
103. Captain Jack (1896)
104. Roy Royland (1896)
105. Frank and Saxon (1897)
106. The Little Skipper (1897)
107. Vince the Rebel (1897)
108. The Silver Salvors (1898)
109. A Woman Worth Winning (1898)
110. Draw Swords! (1898)
111. Our Soldier Boy (1898)
112. Jungle and Stream (1898)
113. Nic Revel (1898)
114. In the Mahdi's Grasp (1899)
115. King O' the Beach (1899)
116. The Vibart Affair (1899)
117. A Crimson Crime (1899)
118. Ned Ledger (1899)
119. Fix Bay'nets! (1899)
120. Young Robin Hood (1899)
121. King Robert's Page (1900)
122. Uncle Bart (1900)
123. The Ocean Waif (1900)
124. A Young Hero (1900)
125. Old Gold (1900)
126. The King's Sons (1900)
127. The Lost Middy (1900)
128. The Powder Monkey (1900)
129. A Dash From Diamond City (1901)
130. The Kopje Garrison (1901)
131. The Cankerworm (1901)
132. Pulabad (1901)
133. Something Like a Snake (1901)
134. Running Amok (1901)
135. Ching, the Chinaman, and His Middy Friends (1901)
136. Coastguard Jack (1902)
137. The Peril Finders (1902)
138. Black Shadows (1902)
139. Stan Lynn (1902)
140. The King's Esquires (1903)
141. Walsh the Wonder-Worker (1903)
142. It Came to Pass (1903)
143. Fitz the Filibuster (1903)
144. Coming Home to Roost (1904)
145. Blind Policy (1904)
146. The Ocean Cat's Paw (1904)
147. Rob Harlow's Adventures (1904)
148. Glyn Severn's School-days (1904)
149. Marcus, the Young Centurion (1904)
150. To Win or to Die (1904)
151. Trapper Dan (1905)
152. Nephew Jack (1905)
153. So Like a Woman (1905)
154. Shoulder Arms! (1905)
155. Hunting the Skipper (1906)
156. Dead Man's Land (1906)
157. Aynsley's Case (1906)
158. Happy Playmates (1906)
159. Tention! (1906)
160. Trapped By Malays (1907)
161. The Country Squire (1907)

=== Short stories ===
1. Begumbagh (1869)
2. Adventures of Working Men (1881)
3. In Jeopardy (1889)
4. Sawed Off (1891)
5. Princess Fedor's Pledge (1891)
6. Tales of Peril and Heroism (1898)
7. Two Rough Stones, and A Bad Day's Fishing (1902)
8. A Meeting Of Greeks and the Tug Of War (1902)
9. Brave and True, and Other Stories (1902)
10. The Traitor's Gait [sic] (1906)

=== Plays (with James Henry Darnley) ===
1. The Balloon (1899)
2. The Barrister (1899)

=== Biographies ===
1. Memoir of B. F. Stevens (1903)
2. George Alfred Henty (1907)

=== Anthologies (signed G M F) ===
1. The World of Wit and Humour: (1871)
2. A Book of Fair Women (1872)

=== Other works ===
1. Featherland (1866)
2. Original Penny Readings (1866)
3. Christmas Penny Readings (1867)
4. Midnight Webs (1872)
5. The Blue Dragoons (1875)
6. Friends I Have Made (1881)
7. My Patients (1883)
8. In the Wilds of New Mexico (1888)
9. Diamond Dyke (1895)
10. High Play (1897)
11. The Khedive's Country (1904)
12. Little People's Book of Wild Animals (1905)
