= Paul Hardy (illustrator) =

English illustrator (1862–1942)

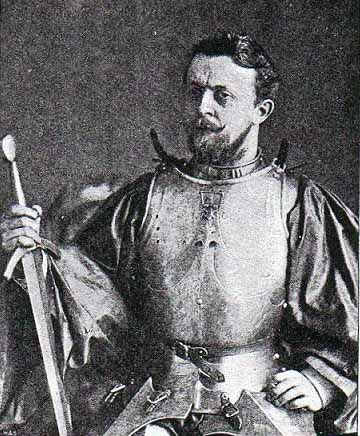
- Paul Hardy in costume
- Born: David Paul Frederick Hardy; 2 August 1862; Bath, Somerset, England
- Died: 2 January 1942 (aged 79); Storrington, Sussex, England
- Occupation: Illustrator

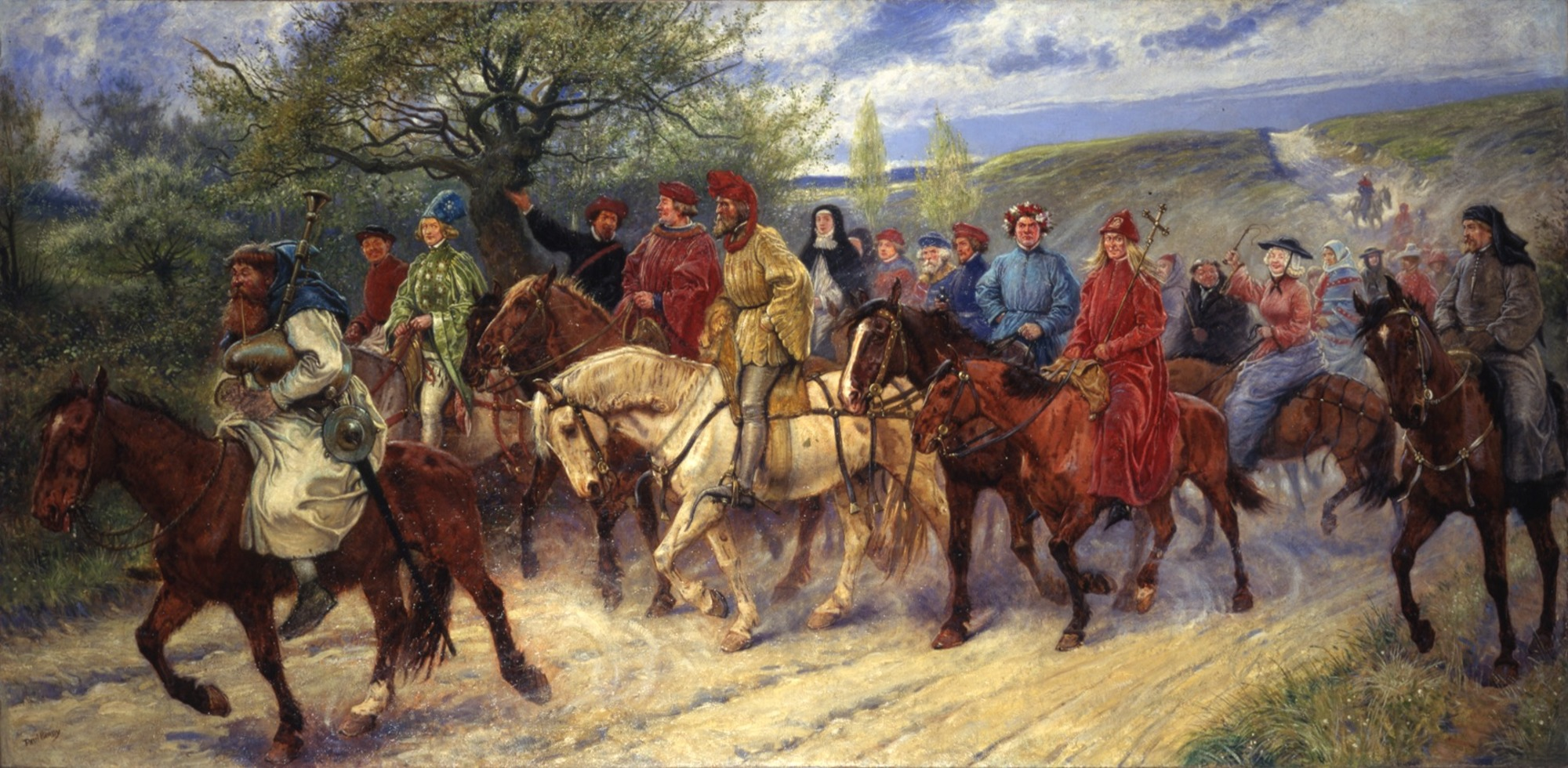
Canterbury Pilgrims (1903)

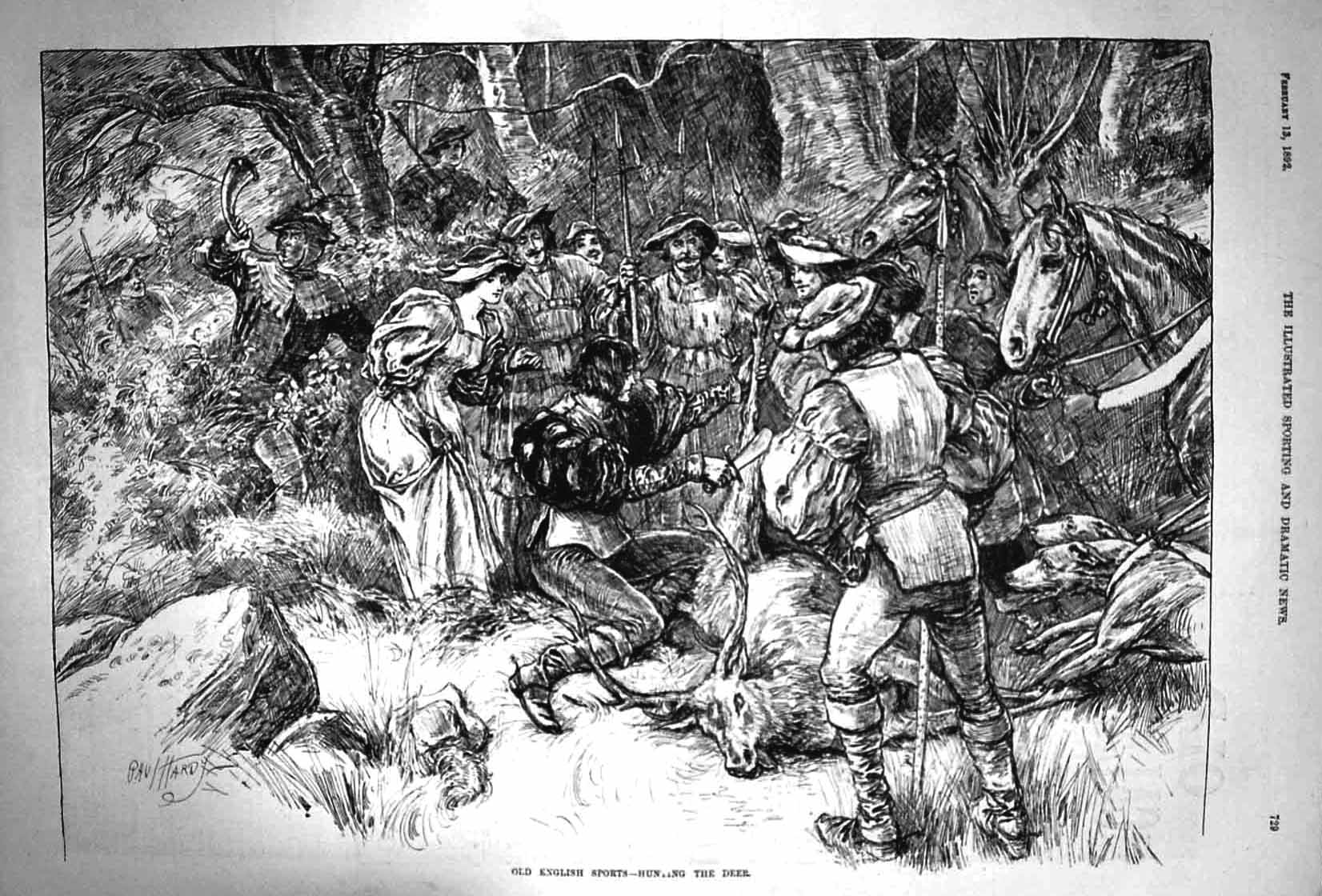
Deer hunt (1892)

Paul Hardy (baptised David Paul Frederick Hardy; 2 August 1862 – 2 January 1942), was an English illustrator, best known for his regular illustrations in The Strand Magazine, his painting of Canterbury Pilgrims (1903) and for his drawings associated with the serials of the writer Samuel Walkey (1871–1953). Paul was the eldest child of David and Emily Hardy. Paul's father was also an artist, as was his grandfather James Hardy senior and his uncles James Hardy junior and Heywood Hardy, all from an old Yorkshire family. All Paul's siblings, Norman, Evelyn and Dorothy Hardy, were illustrators.

== Early life and education ==
Paul Hardy was born on 2 August 1862, near Bath, Somerset. He received his education in Clifton, Bristol. He settled in Chelsea, London in 1886 and married the sculptor Ida Mary Wilton Clarke (1862–1955) on 28 July 1888 at St. Matthias, Earl's Court, in Kensington and Chelsea, London. After their marriage the couple moved to Bexleyheath for a few years, then to Chobham, Cheltenham, Tisbury and finally to The Cottage, Church Street, Storrington. He designed and made the original galleon weathervane, now kept inside St Mary's church in Storrington. His son was Brigadier Gordon Paul Umfreville Hardy (1894-1974) who married Sophia H. Dickinson in 1917.

== Work ==
Hardy exhibited at the Royal Academy in 1890 with His Majesty Henry VIII visits Sir Thomas More at Chelsea and again in 1899 with There it befell, that as they rode near a forest, they saw a damsel and her dwarf sore distressed. These are the only Royal Academy Exhibition works attributed to Hardy up to 1905.

Hardy was a skilled metal worker and made his own replica armour. He was an advisor to both the Armoury Department at the British Museum and to the Auctioneer Sotheby's. In recognition of his work as a black-and-white artist, and his contribution to the study of medieval arms and armour, he was granted a Civil List pension of £80 in 1932. This was followed by a Royal Academy pension of £50 seven years later.

Hardy illustrated at least 170 books in his career, and was equally prolific with magazines. One of the juvenile magazines he regularly drew for was Chums, which he produced illustrations for from 1896 to 1940, over 40 years. One book that Hardy illustrated was The Story of Susan by Alice Dudeney (1903). (Hardy's affair with Alice Dudeney contributed to the separation of the Dudeneys in 1913).

Hardy died on 2 January 1942 in Storrington, Sussex.

=== Authors whose work was illustrated by Hardy ===
The authors whose work Hardy illustrated include the following (based on the list provided by Kirkpatrick):

- William Harrison Ainsworth (1805–1882), an English poet and historical novelist who published nearly 40 novels and wrote juvenile fiction for magazines.
- Jane Austen (1775–1817), an English novelist known primarily for Pride and Prejudice and her five other major novels that have hardly ever been out of print since first published.
- R. M. Ballantyne (1825–1894), a prolific Scottish author of juvenile fiction and an accomplished watercolourist.
- Honoré de Balzac (1799–1850), a French playwright and novelist
- George Borrow (1903–1881), English writer of travel books and novels
- Sheila E. Braine (1867 – ), Sheila Emma Braine, an English journalist, songwriter, and author of books for young children.
- F. S. Brereton (1872–1957), who wrote tales of Imperial heroism for children.
- Charlotte Brontë (1816–1855), a poet and novelist and the eldest of the three Bronte Sisters.
- John Byron (1723–1786), a British Royal Navy officer and explorer. He wrote about his experience of shipwreck.
- Jennie Chappell (1857 – ), a prolific author of fiction, accounts of women in the workplace, and juvenile fiction
- Maria Louisa Charlesworth (1819–1880), an English author of religious books for children and religious tracts.
- Wilkie Collins (1824–1889), an English playwright, author of The Lady in White and The Moonstone
- Hendrik Conscience (1812–1883), a Belgian novelist who published over one hundred novels, and is best known for his romantic nationalist novels
- Susan Coolidge (1835–1905), Sarah Chauncey Woolsey, an American author of juvenile fiction including What Katy Did
- Darley Dale (1848–1931), Francesca Maria Steele, an English novelist who wrote both non-fiction under her own name and fiction under the pseudonym Darley Dale
- Arthur Conan Doyle (1859–1930), writer and medical doctor, creator of Sherlock Holmes
- Mrs Henry Dudeney (1866–1945), Alice Louisa Dudeney (née Whiffin), an English writer who published over fifty volumes of fiction.
- Alexandre Dumas (1802–1870), French author of The Three Musketeers
- Mary Ellen Edwards (1862–1908), a British painter and illustrator who drew for young children. Also known a Mrs Freer, and by her married name Mrs. John C. Staples (Note: Although Kirkpatrick gives a title by Mary Ellen Edwards as having been illustrated by Willian Rainey. This seems unlikely as she was an illustrator herself.)
- Evelyn Everett-Green (1856–1932), who moved from pious stores for children, through historical romances, to adult romances under a range of pseudonyms.
- George Manville Fenn (1831–1909), prolific author of fiction for young adults.
- Henry Frith (1840–1917), prolific Irish author and translator for many of Jules Verne's novels.
- Bret Harte (1836–1902), American short-story writer and poet.
- G. A. Henty (1832–1902), prolific writer of boy's adventure fiction, often set in a historical context, who had himself served in the military and been a war correspondent.
- Thomas Hughes (1822–1926), English lawyer, judge, politician, and author, now best remembered for semi-autobiographical Tom Brown's School Days (1857)
- Victor Hugo (1802–1885), French poet, dramatist, and novelist, who is now best remembered for Les Misérables, (1862) and The Hunchback of Notre-Dame (1831)
- Leigh Hunt (1784–1859), James Henry Leigh Hunt, an English poet, critic, editor, and essayist
- Raymond Jacberns
- Henry St John (1869–1926), Charles Henry St John Cooper, a prolific English author of juvenile fiction for both boys (as Henry St John) and girls (as Mabel St John) among other pseudonyms.
- David Ker (1841–1914), an English journalist, traveller, soldier, and author of juvenile fiction, who based the action in his stories on his own hair-raising experiences.
- Henry Kingsley (1830–1876), an English novelist, editor, and war correspondent, a brother to Charles Kingsley.
- W. H. G. Kingston (1814–1880), who wrote boy's adventure fiction.
- Robert Leighton (1858–1934), Scottish journalist, editor and a prolific author of juvenile fiction and non-fiction books about dogs and their care.
- Edward Bulwer Lytton (1803–1873), Edward George Earle Lytton Bulwer-Lytton, 1st Baron Lytton, an English politician and writer who first used the opening line It was a dark and stormy night.
- Bessie Marchant (1862–1941), who wrote adventure fiction featuring young female heroines, sometimes used the pseudonym Bessie Comfort.
- Frederick Marryat (1792–1848), a Royal Navy officer who wrote adventure books for children.
- Dorothea Moore (1881–1993), an English actress, Voluntary Aid Detachment nurse's aide, and the author of more than sixty works of juvenile fiction including both historical fiction and school stories.
- Georgina Norway (1833–1915), who wrote adventure fiction for children as "G. Norway".
- D. H. Parry (1868–1950), David Harold Parry, who also wrote as Morton Pike and Captain Eilton Blacke, English writer of serial stories and other juvenile fiction, wrote for Chums from 1892 to 1935, from a family of painters and a painter himself, was an expert on the Napoleonic Wars.
- Bertram Fletcher Robinson (1870–1907), an English barrister, sportsman, journalist, editor, author and Liberal Unionist Party activist
- Mary E. Ropes (1842 – ), Mary Emily Ropes
- Walter Scott (1771–1832), the Scottish author of Ivanhoe.
- Gordon Stables (1840–1910), a Scottish medical doctor who wrote boys' adventure fiction.
- Grace Stebbing (1840–1936), a prolific author of moral tales for boys and girls as well as historical romances and biographies. She wrote her first book aged 7 and her last one at 91, with 89 books in total as well as numerous short stories.
- Samuel Walkey (1871–1953), a Cornish senior bank official who turned to writing boys stories to occupy him while travelling for work.
- May Wynne (1875–1949), author of formulaic juvenile fiction, mostly animal and school stories who also wrote some adult historical fiction, with nearly 200 books in total.

==== Example of story illustration ====
Rogues of the Fiery Cross was Samuel Walkey's (10 July 1871 – 29 March 19) second serial novel. It appeared in Chums in the 1896 – 1897 volume and it was a huge success. It was illustrated by Hardy, as was almost all of Walkey's subsequent work in Chums. After appearing in Chums Rogues was almost immediately published as a book by Cassell & Co., London in 1897 with sixteen full-page illustrations, as shown below:

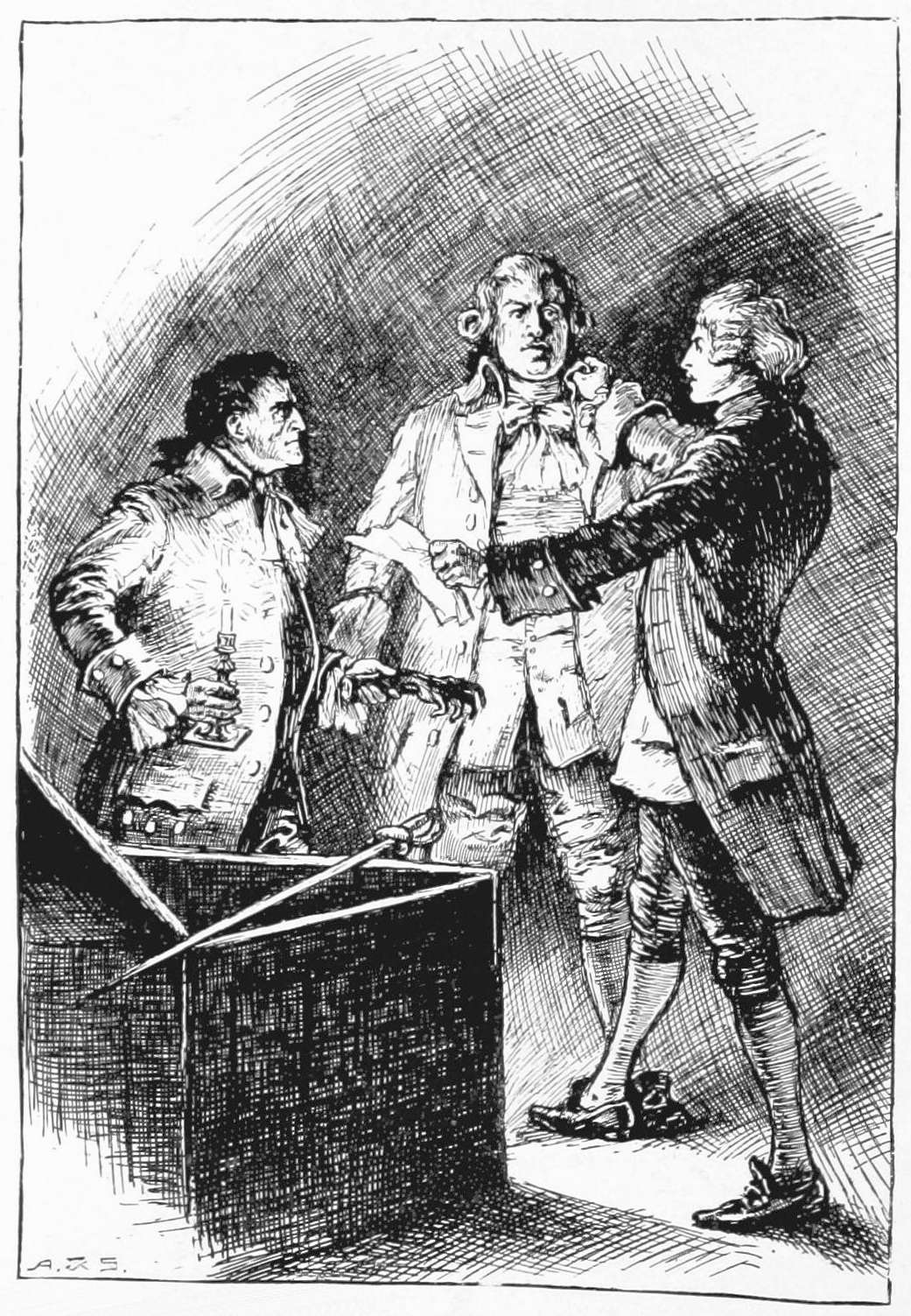
I caught him by the collar

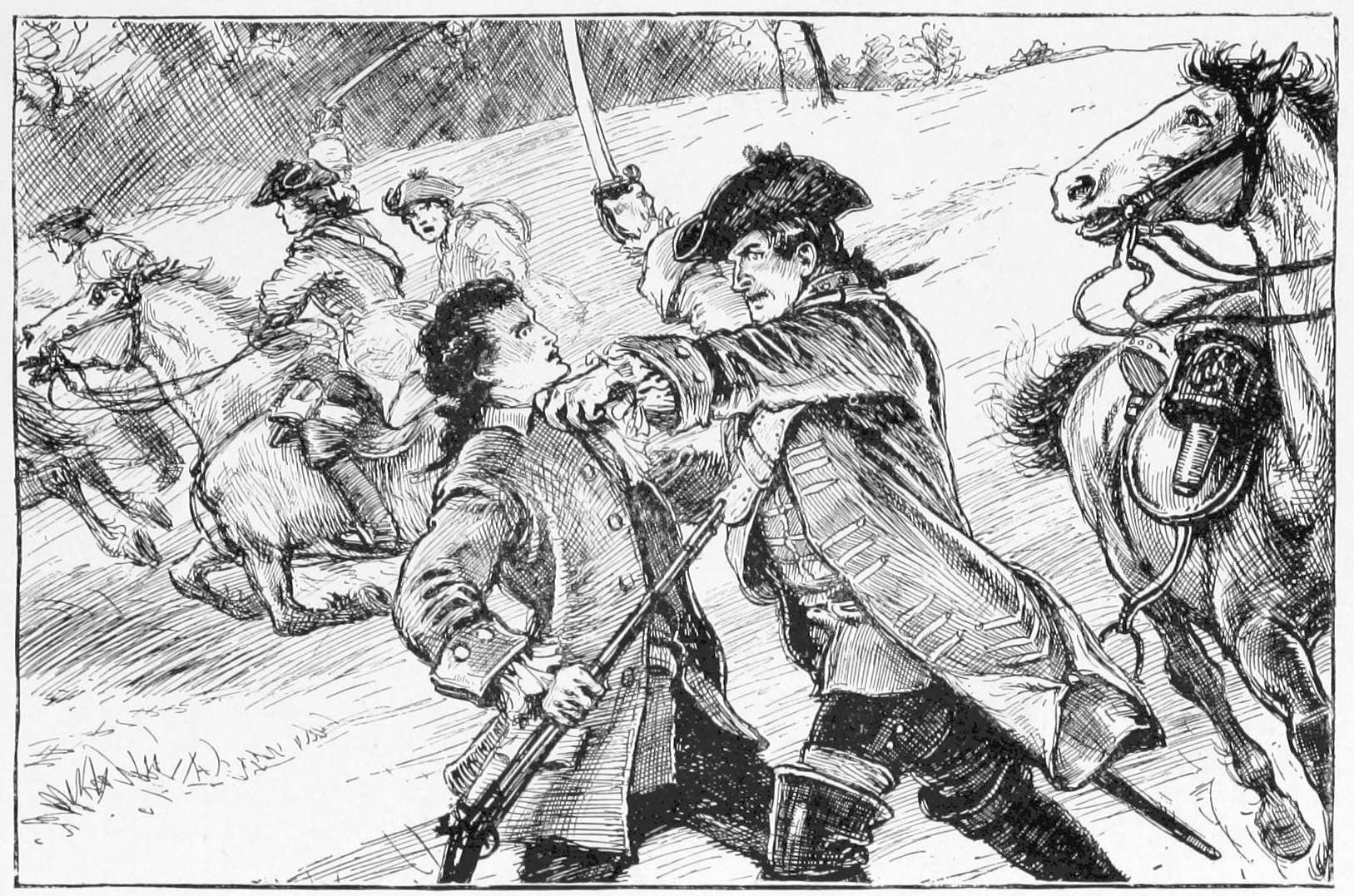
One caught me roughly by the throat

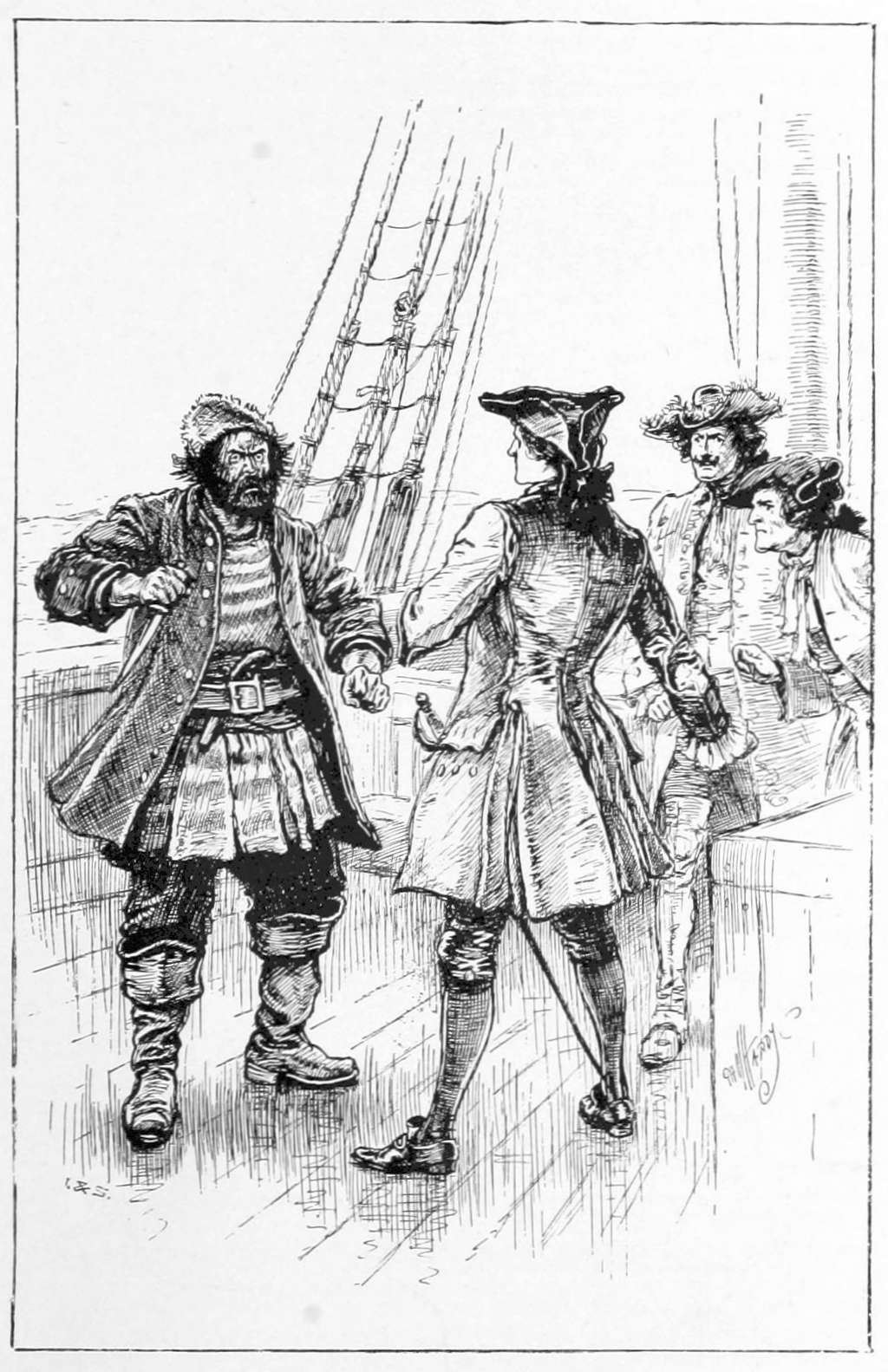
He drew a knife

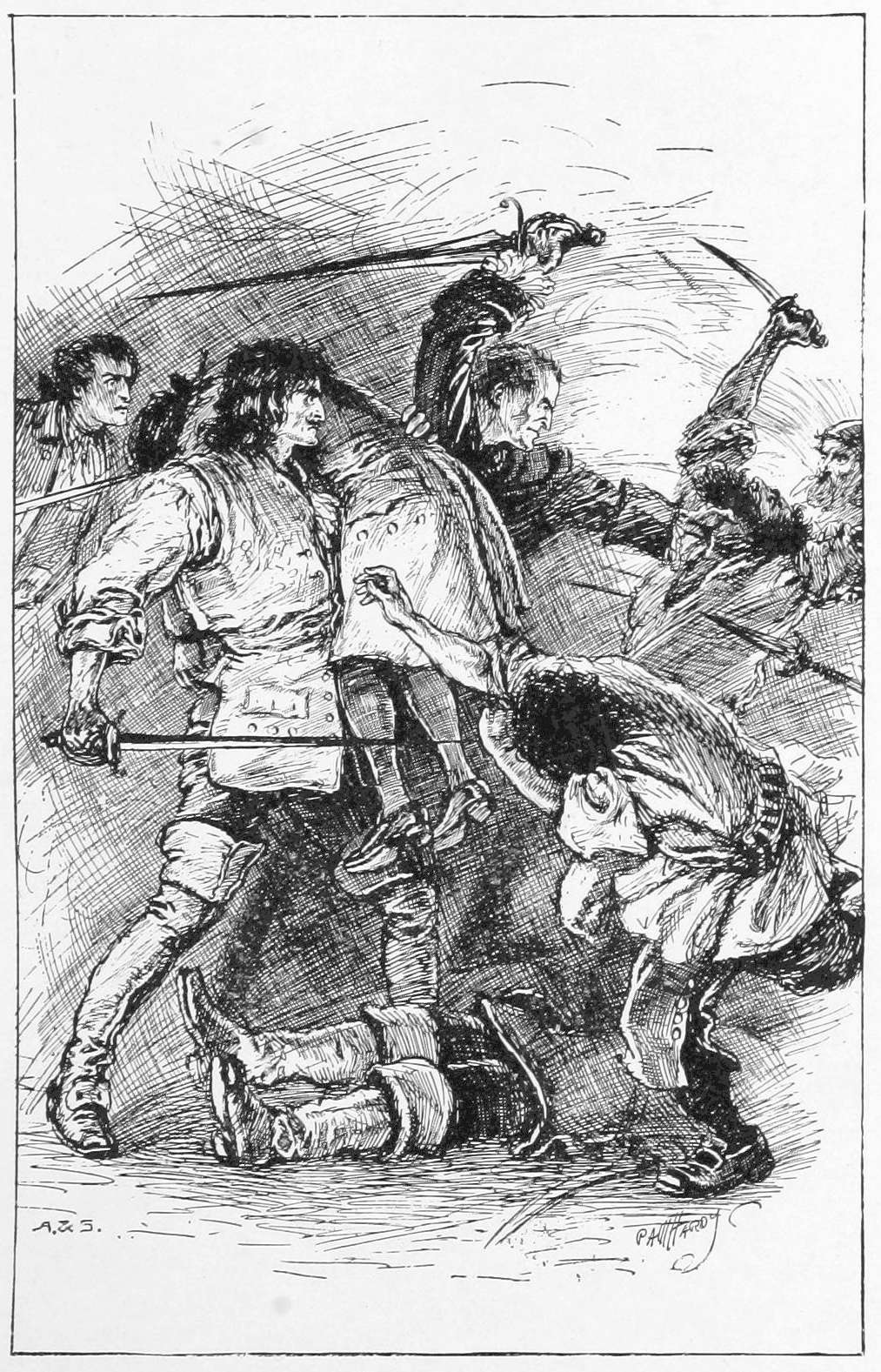
His sword came swinging down

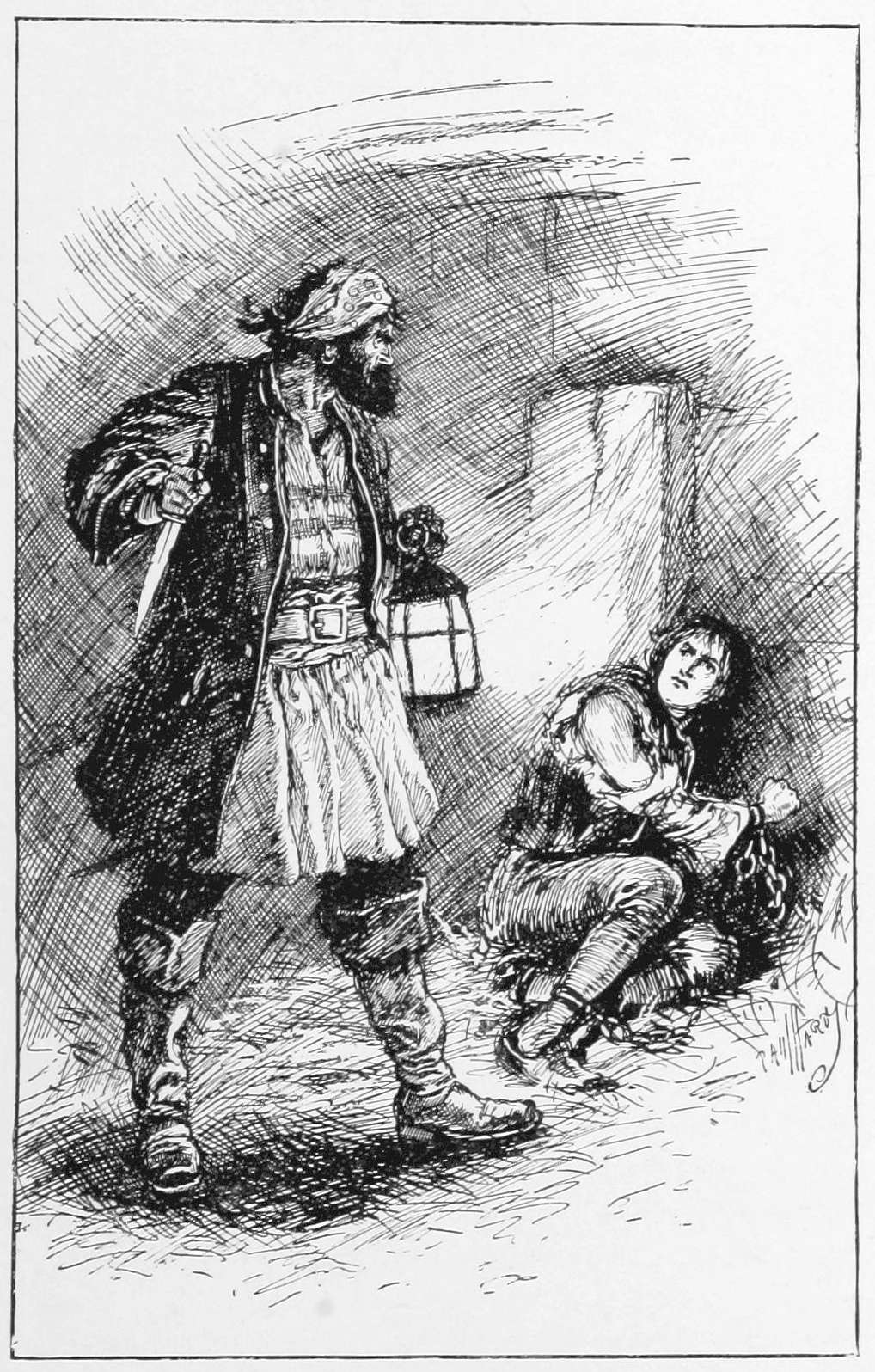
Turn over- he cried

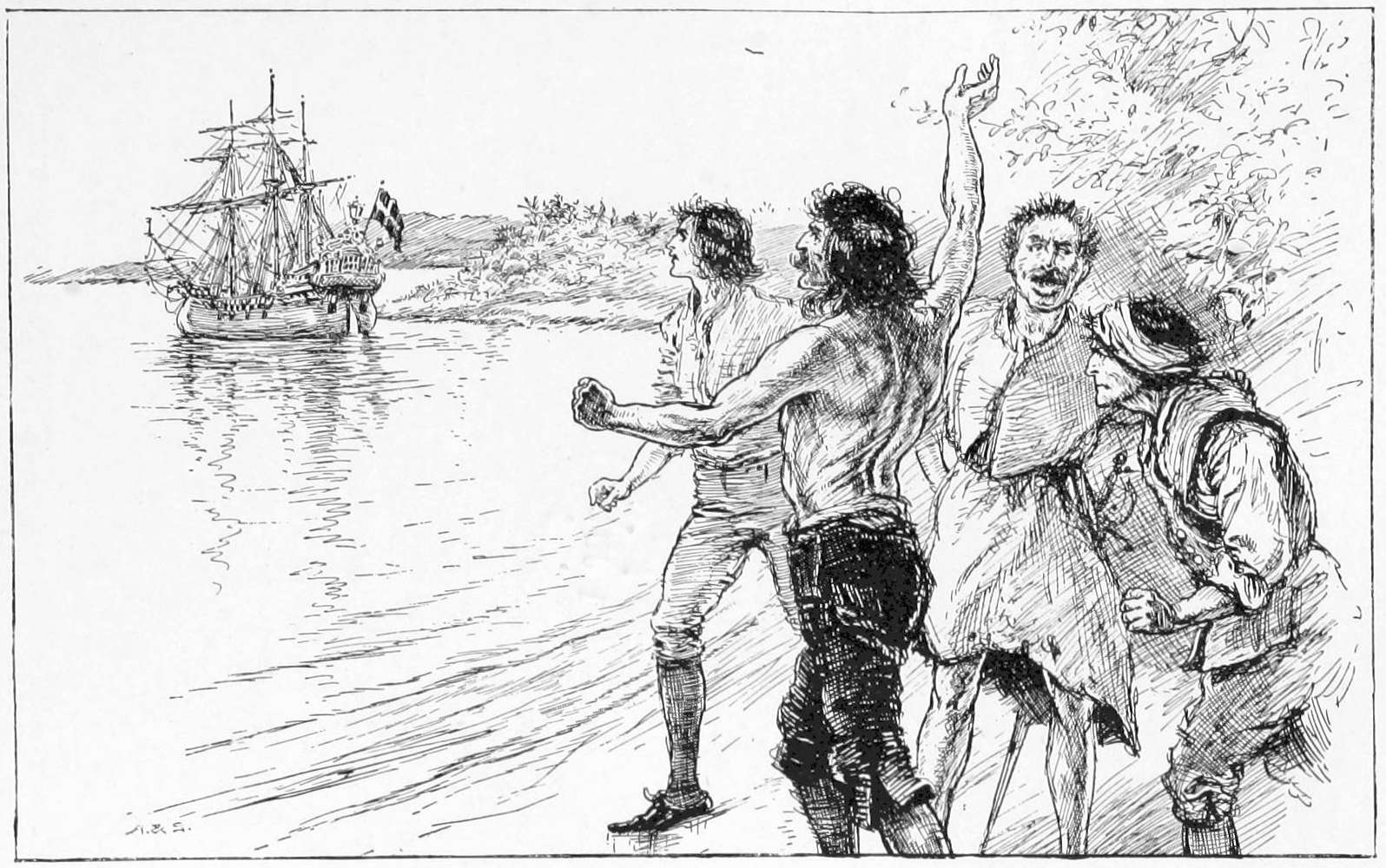
A ship lay in the lagoon

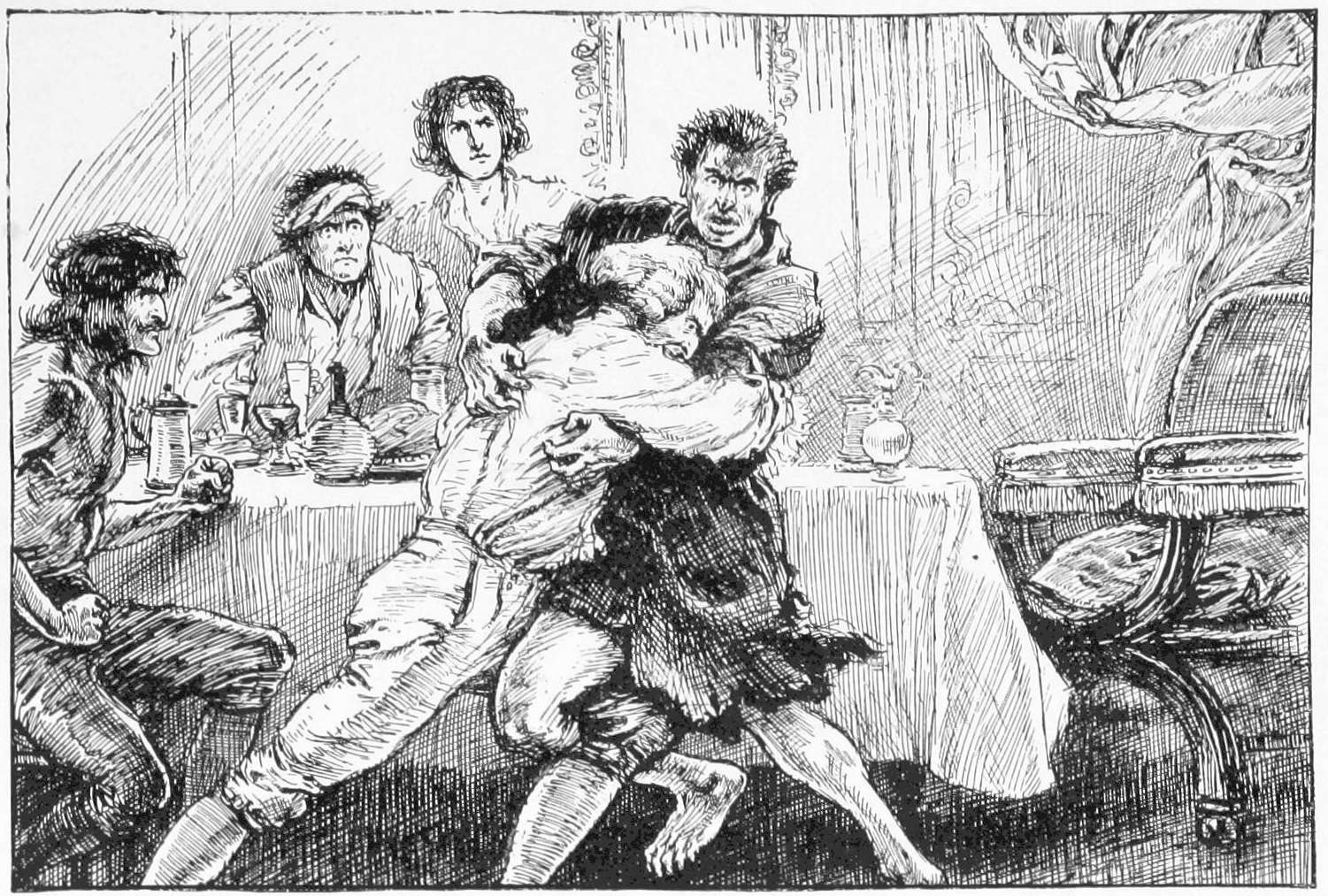
The two hurtled up and down

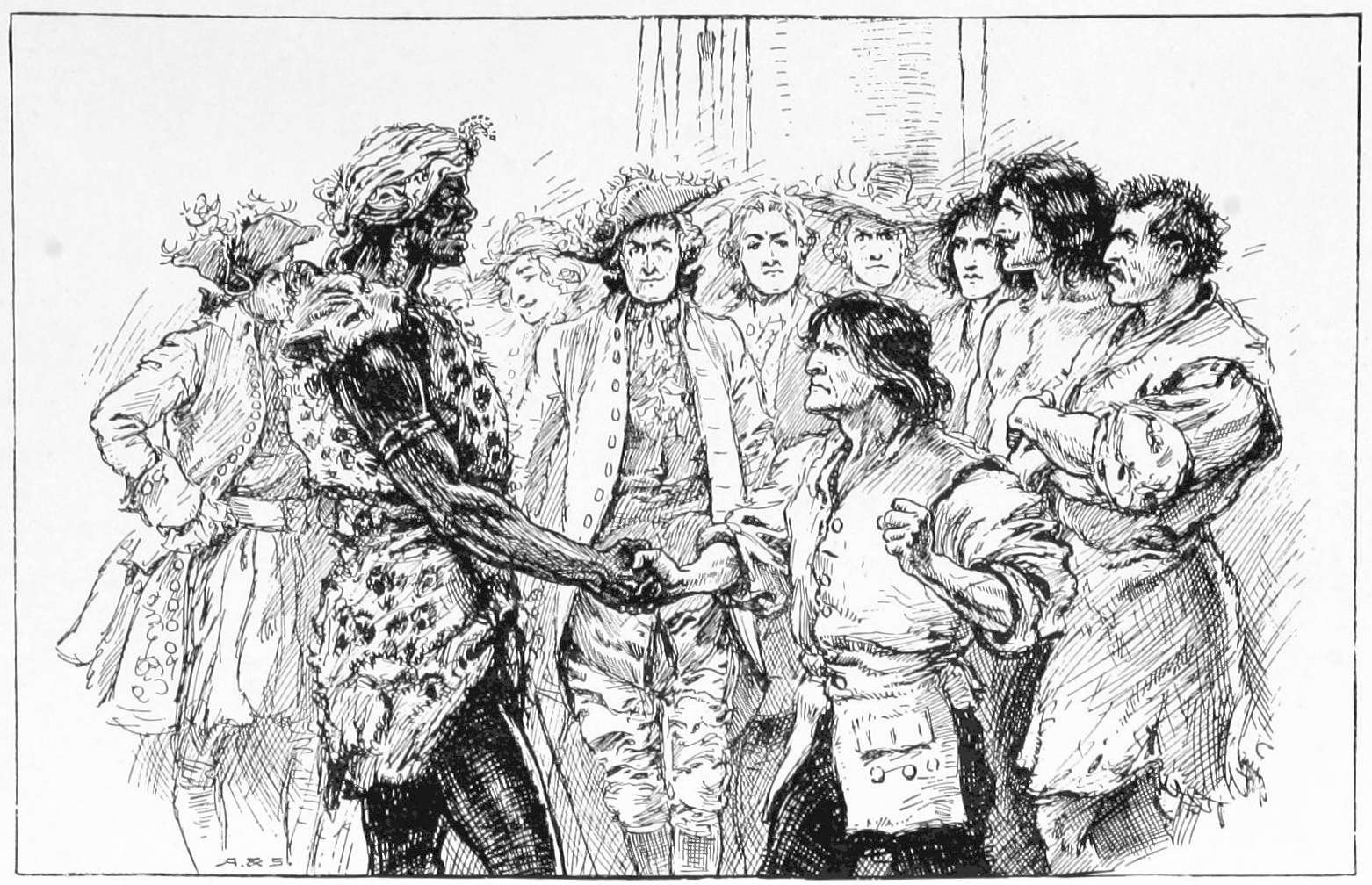
He wore a ceaseless grin

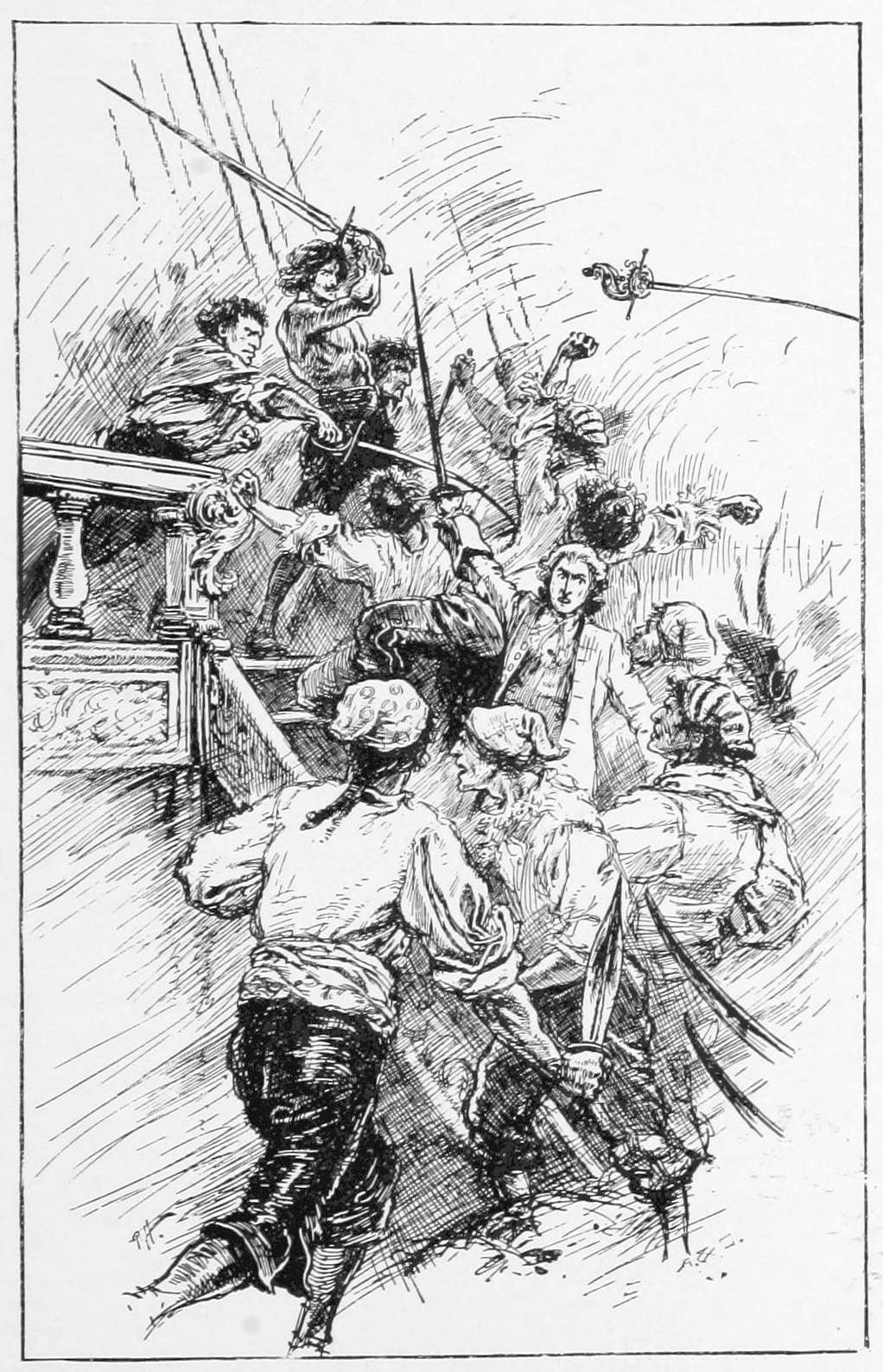
They burst up the stairs

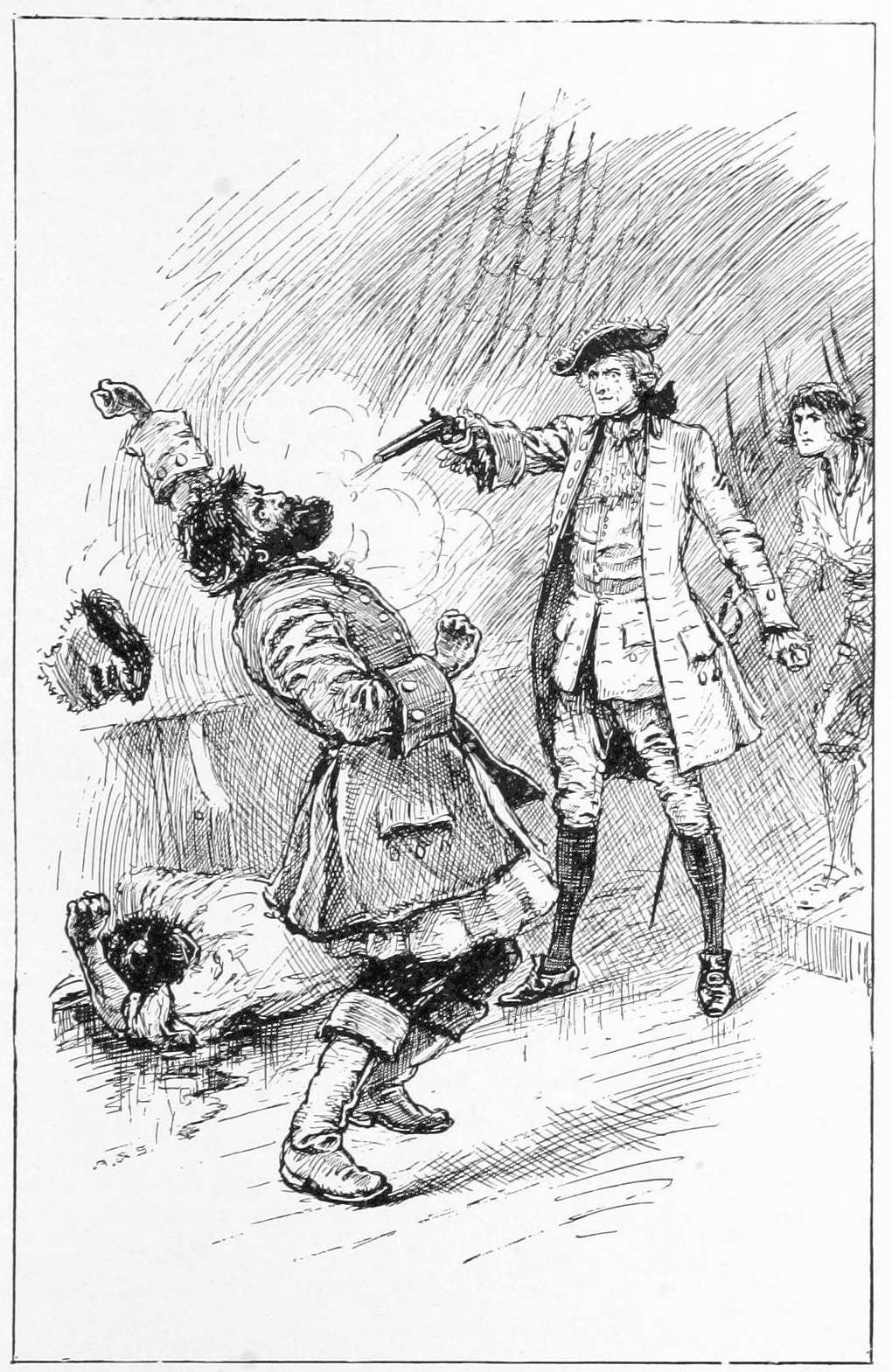
He drew a pistol and pulled the trigger

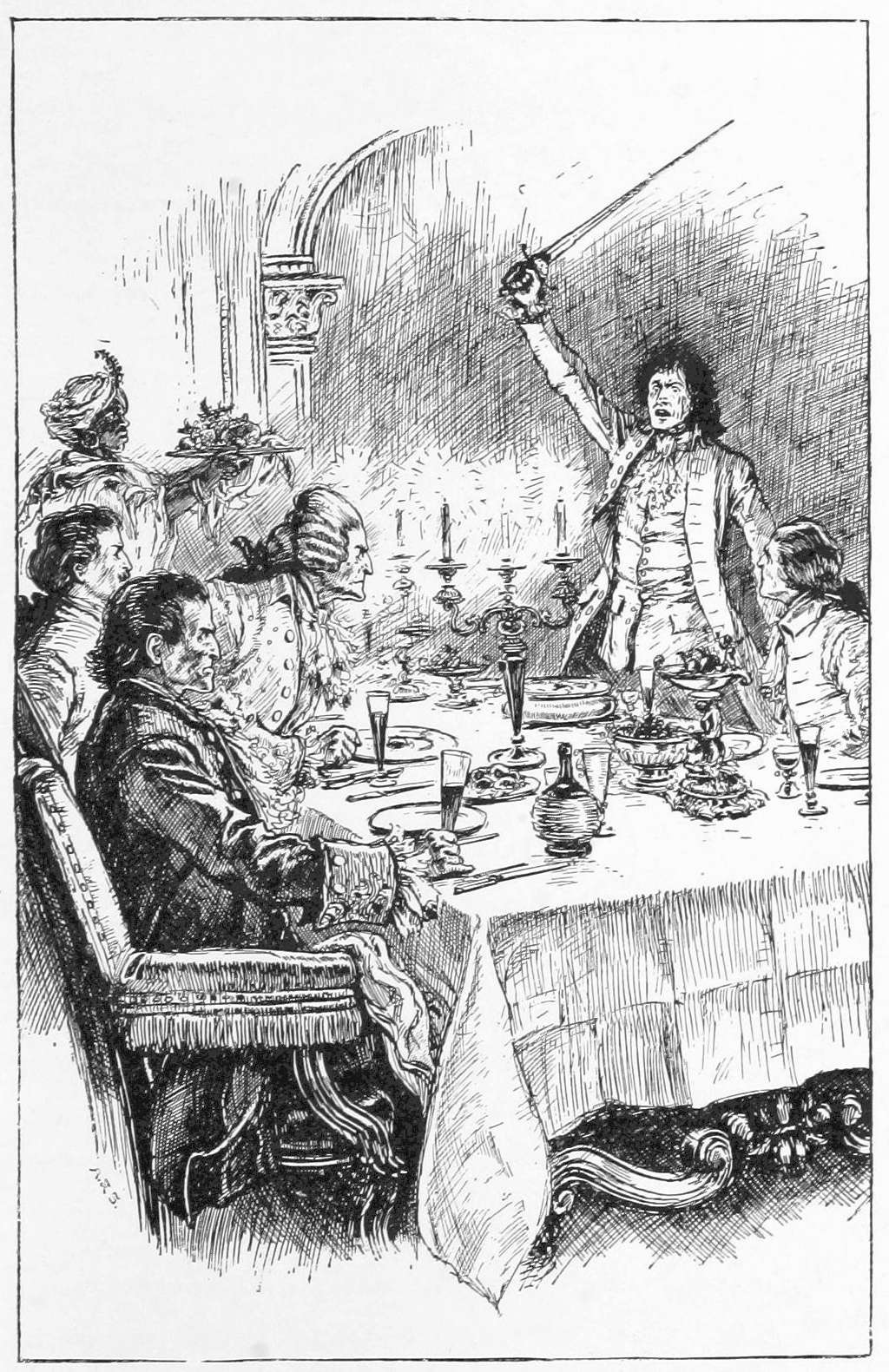
He flung his rapier round and round

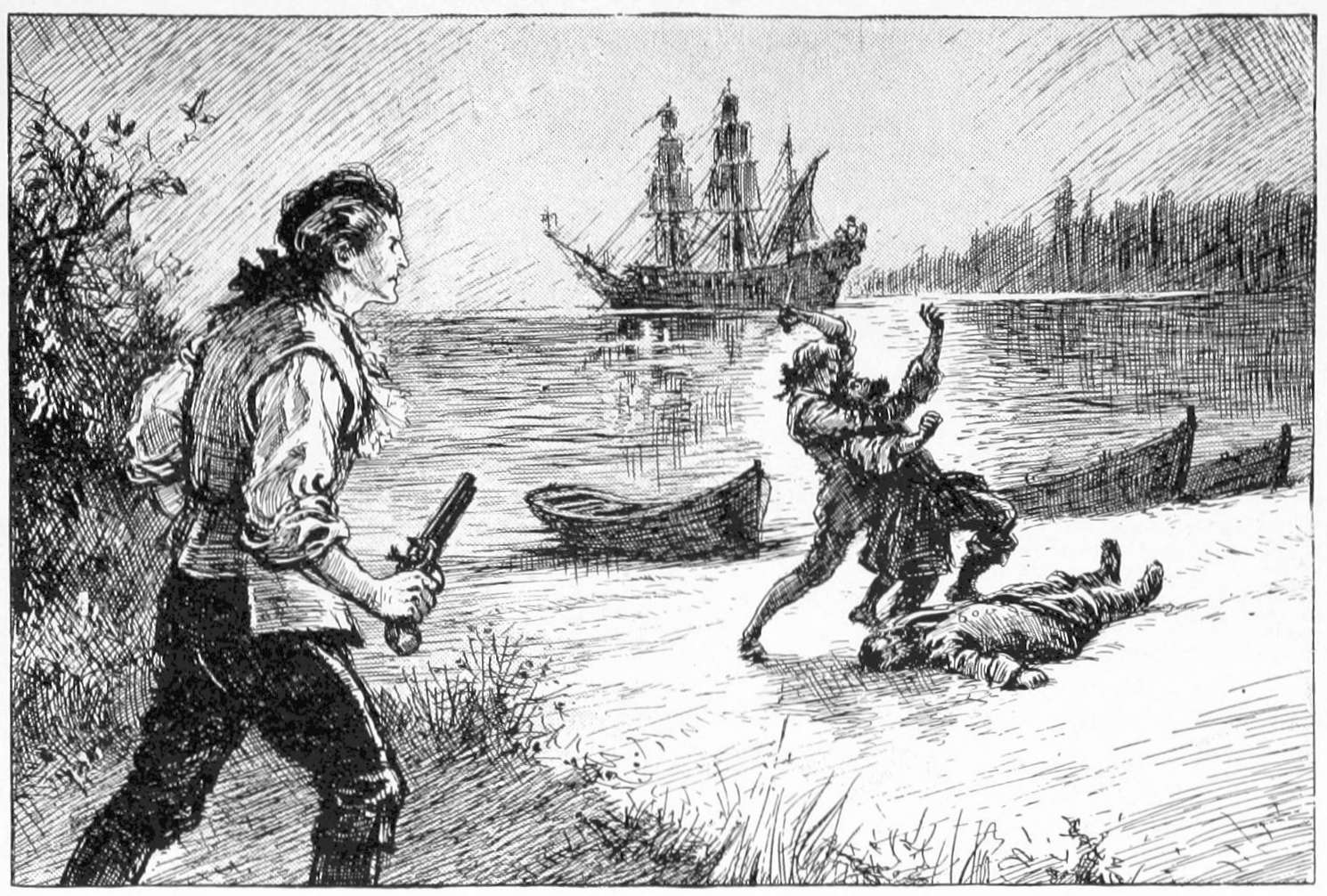
He stabbed the second man

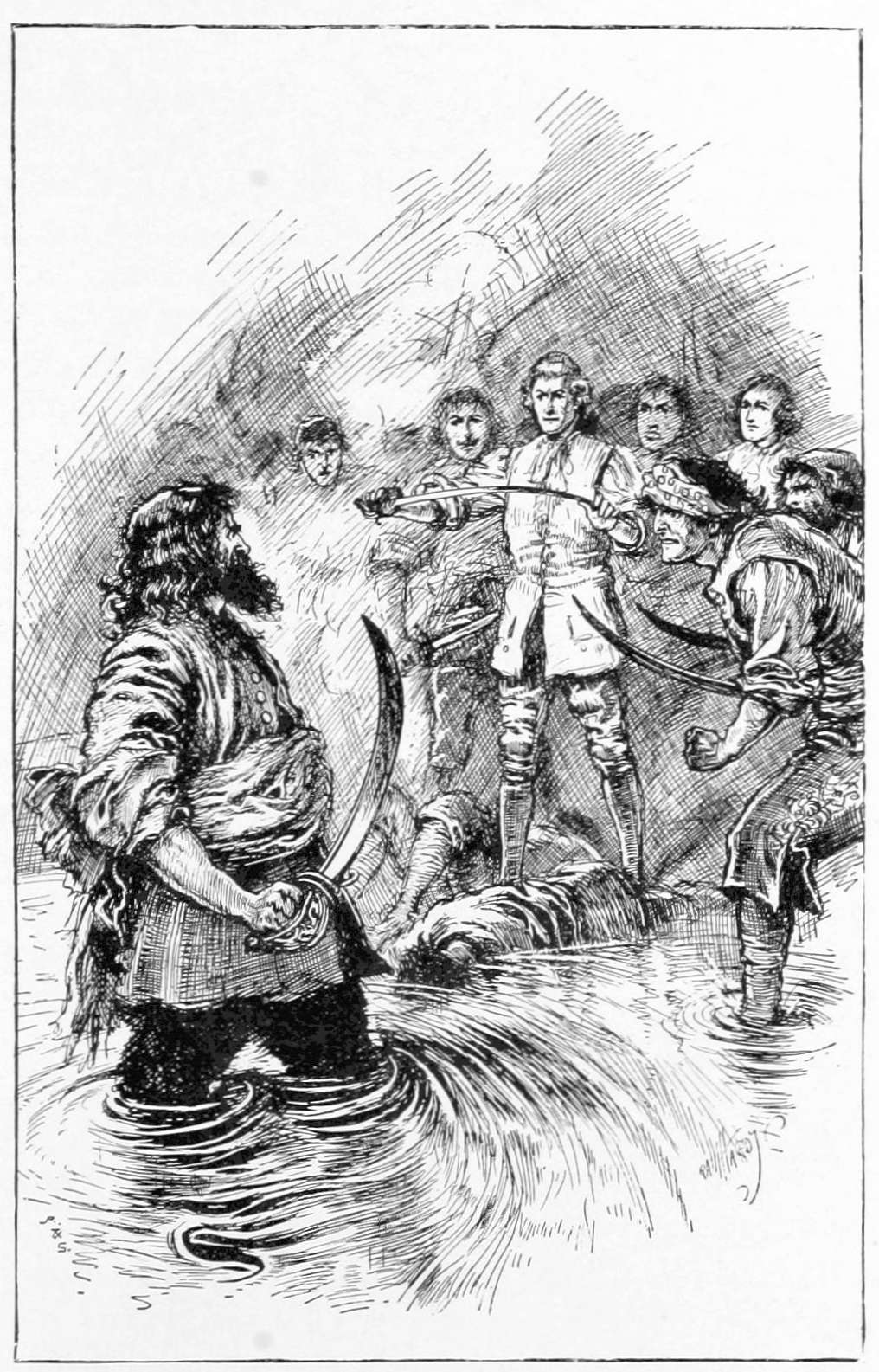
The Dutchman fought with desperate fury

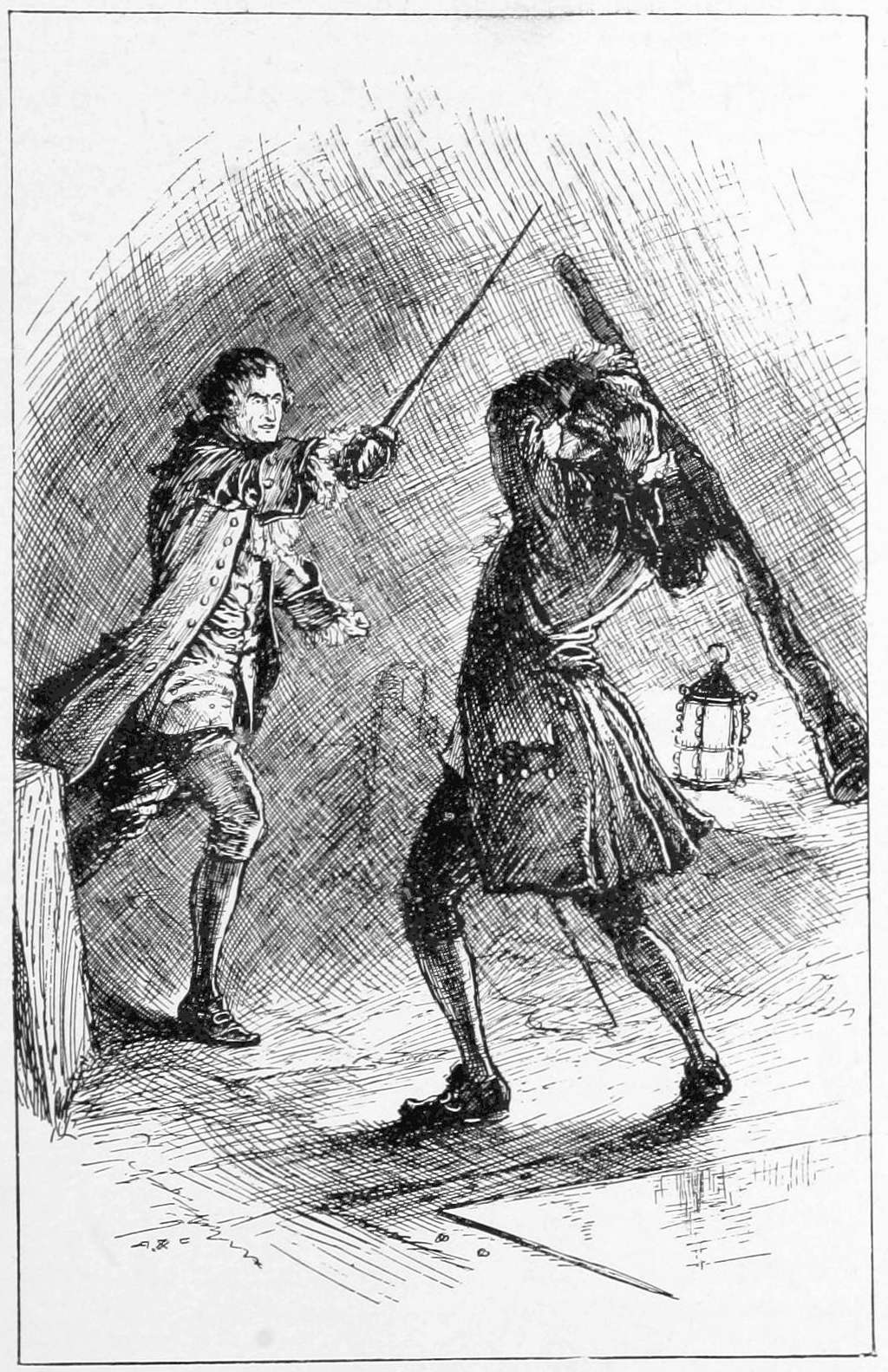
The heavy wood dropped backwards

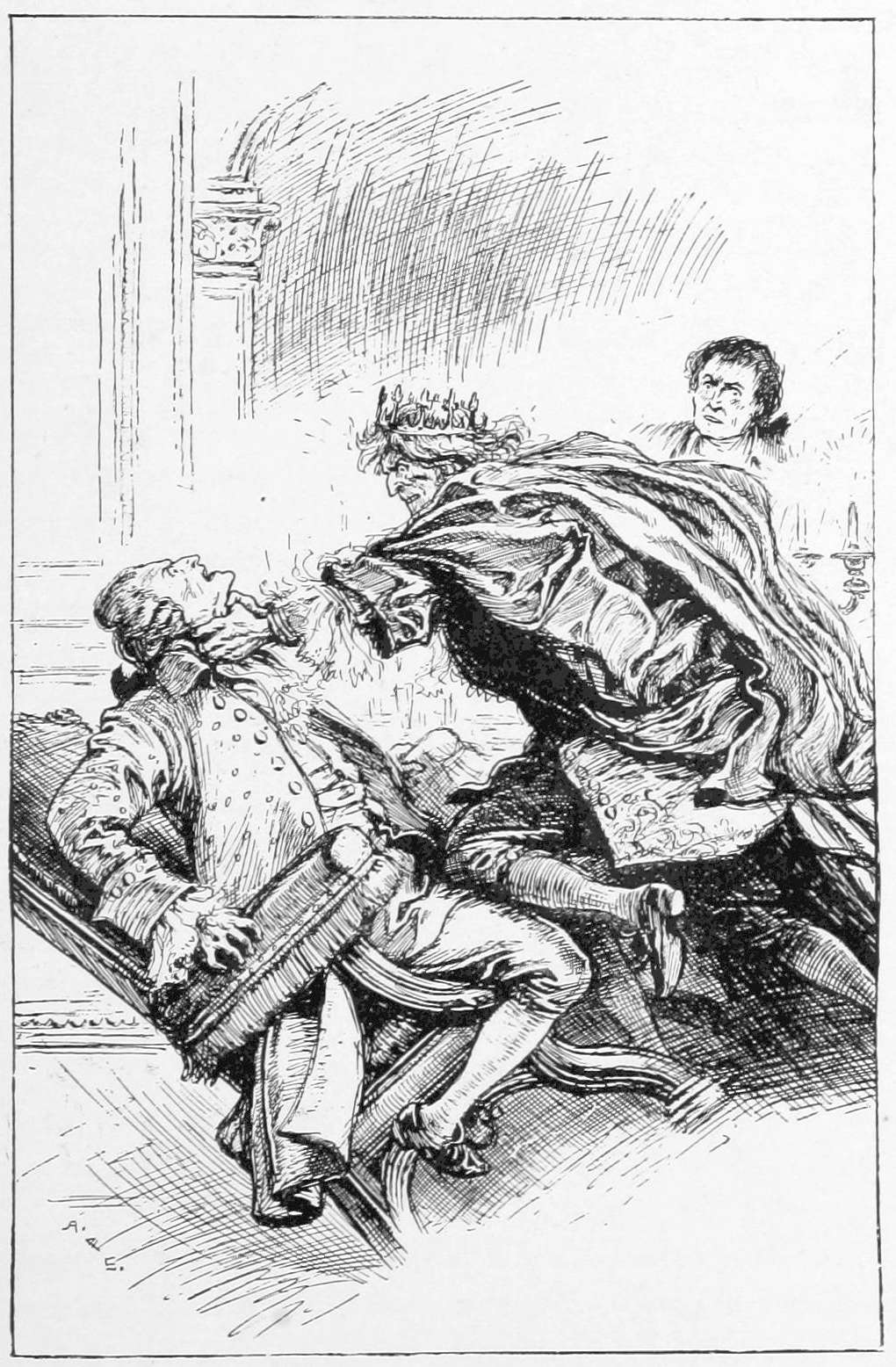
My fathers hands were tight upon his throat

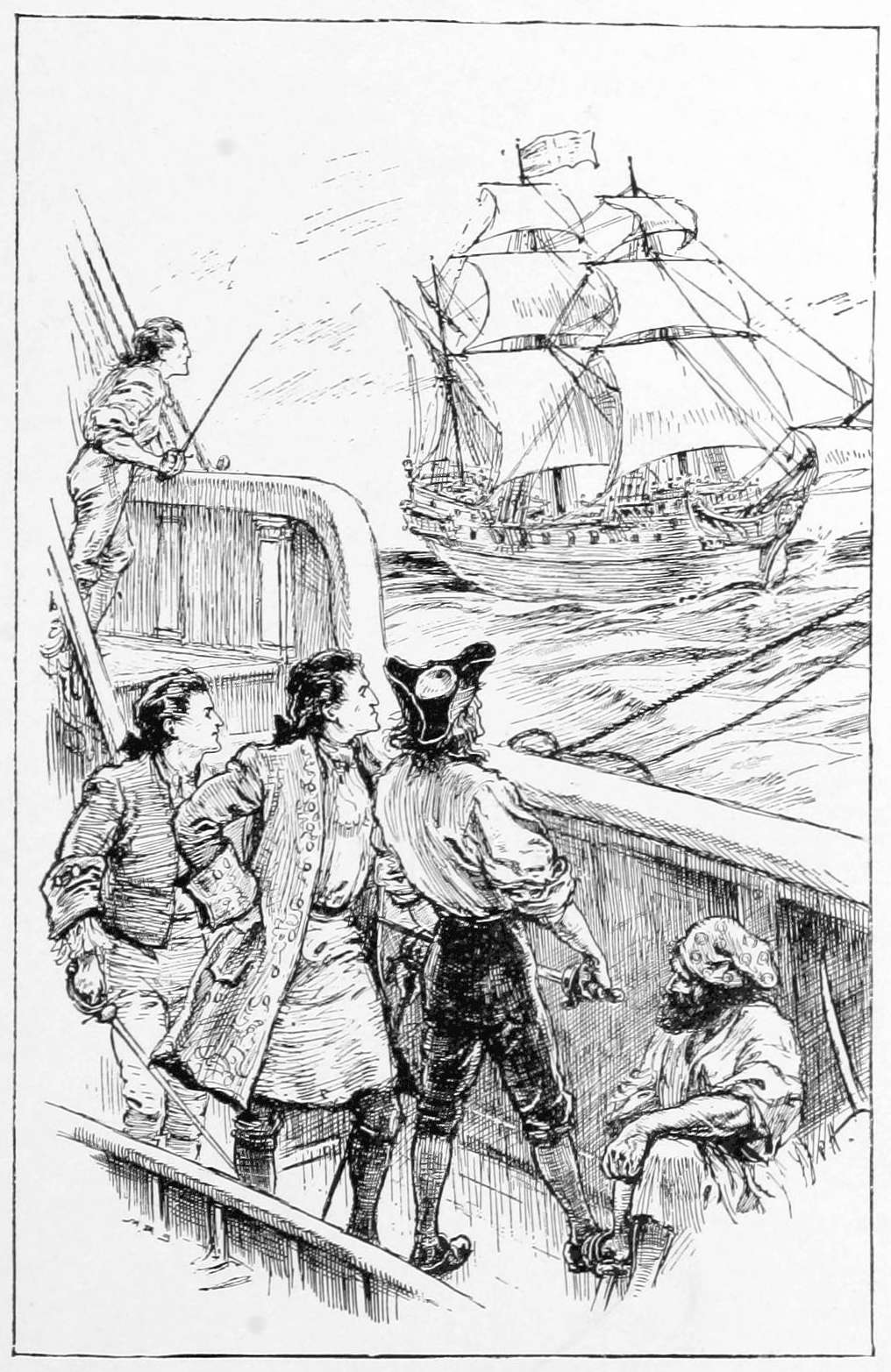
The ship came nearer and nearer

== Assessment of Hardy ==
Peppin says that Hardy was a prolific illustrator of adventure stories, particularly in Magazines. Hardy paid attention to historical detail including the rigging of ships and period costume. He maintained a collection of period costumes for his models to wear for his illustrations. Houfe notes that Hardy was one of the artist's whose work proprietor George Newnes had on display in his two-room gallery at the office of The Strand Magazine. Houfe also provides an image of the Art Gallery.

Houfe states that Hardy is at his best in costume romances and adolescent series. . . Overall, he considers Hardy A prolific but unexciting purveyor of adventure. However, Kirkpatrick quotes Brian Doyle in his Who's Who of Boys' Writers and Illustrators (1964) as saying that: Hardy’s work was at once distinctive and accomplished. The villainous characters who formed his pirate crews were faithfully portrayed and completely authentic, as were the nautical details of the old-fashioned ships he drew ... His characters invariably had staring eyes, turned-down mouths and were seldom inactive or in repose. Cooper, who rarely comments on the quality of illustrations in the titles he is cataloguing, refers to Hardy's illustrations as Stylish. The ultimate compliment is probably the way in which Chums, who had a huge stable of illustrators, kept using his work for over 40 years.
