= Georgina Norway =

British writer

- Born: 2 December 1833; Liverpool, Lancashire, England
- Died: 3 March 1915 (aged 81); Killiney, Dublin, Ireland
- Occupation: Writer
- Years active: 1888–1903
- Known for: Children's adventure fiction
- Notable work: The Loss of John Humble

Georgina Norway (1833–1915) was a British writer of children's adventure fiction. She was published under the name G Norway. Her grandson was the writer and engineer Nevil Shute.

== Early life ==
Georgina Shute was born on 2 December 1833 in Liverpool to merchant Stephen Shute and his wife Georgina (née Bent) of Finch Street, Liverpool. She was baptised a month later, on 4 January 1834, in the Renshaw Street Presbyterian Chapel in Liverpool.

== Marriage and writing ==
Georgina married Arthur Stanbury Norway in Farnworth Parish Church, Prescot, near Bolton, Lancashire on 24 September 1857. The couple had two sons, Nevell Edmund (5 August 1858 – 24 October 1902), a surgeon, and Arthur Hamilton (1859 – 25 December 1938), who worked for the Post Office.

Norway's husband Arthur was declared bankrupt and had trustee assigned on 22 June 1864. The bankruptcy dragged on for the nest two and a half years, with the final distribution of the assets in December 1867. The family had two adult servants at the time of the 1861 census, one adult servant by 1871, and had only a 10-year-old girl by 1881. Arthur died in 1886, and Georgina began to write, publishing her first novel, The Brand of Cain in 1888. Norway was living with her sons in Ealing in 1891, and the household now kept one adult (20) and one child servant (14).

Norway published under the name G. Norway. Bassett says that she so successfully concealed her gender that many sources refer to her as "George Norway". However, both The Atheneum and The Review of Reviews when reviewing A True Cornish Maid refer to the author as Mrs. Norway, so her gender was not a secret. However, The Standard used the male pronoun to refer to the author, so it was clear that Norway's gender, while not a secret, was not broadcast.

Norways's books were well-reviewed at the time. The Standard said of The Loss of John Humble, her first full-length novel, that "This story will place the author at once in the front rank. It is full of life and adventure. The interest of the story is sustained without a break from first to last". and The Spectator said "A very spirited story of the sea interspersed with pleasant and lively sketches of Scandinavian manners . . . As good a story of the kind as we have ever seen".

== Personal life ==
Her son Arthur Hamilton was also a writer, and his son was the novelist Nevil Shute. Nevil Shute used the name of one of his grandmother's characters, Johnnie Pascoe, for one of his own characters. In his 1954 autobiography, Slide Rule, Nevil Shute acknowledged the influence that his father and grandmother had had on him as follows: "I don't think there is a great deal in the theory that writing ability is dictated by heredity, but I think there is a great deal in environment. My father and my grandmother both wrote a number of books, so that the business was familiar to me before I started."

Norway was a boarder with the Hills of 75 Haven Lane, Ealing in 1911, but moved to Ireland after her youngest son, Arthur Hamilton Norway, was placed in charge of the Post Office in Ireland in 1912. She died in Killiney, Dublin, Ireland, on 3 March 1915, leaving an estate of £556 to her son Arthur.

== Selected works ==
List of works by G Norway, with catalogue status and the availability of online texts. (Note: This list of novels above is based on a range of sources including primarily the British Library Catalogue for the author. In addition, The Circulating Library Database of Victorian Fiction, Project Gutenberg, the Internet Archive, WorldCat, and HathiTrust were all checked for additional titles. The availability of online texts is shown for Project Gutenberg (PG), The British Library (BL), and the HathiTrust (HT).)
No.	Year	Title	Publisher	In British Library catalogue	In Circulating Library catalogue	ON-line text availability	Pages	Illustrator
1	1888	The Brand of Cain	London: Ward Lock	Yes	Yes	BL	96	
2	1889	Adventures of Johnnie Pascoe	London: James Nisbet	Yes	Yes		100	
3	1890	The Loss of John Humble: What Led to it and What Came of It	London: Blackie	Yes	Yes		351	J. Schonberg
4	1891	How Martin Drake Found his Father: or, Wanderers in the West A Story of White and Black Slavery in the Early Days of the American Colonies	London: Sampson Low	Yes	Yes		342	
5	1891	Hussein the Hostage: or, A Boy's Adventures in Persia	London: Blackie	Yes	Yes	HT	352	J. Schonberg
6	1894	A True Cornish Maid: A Story of the Last Century	London: Blackie	Yes	Yes		288	J. Finnmore
7	1895	Christiaan, the Boy of Leyden: A Story Founded on Fact	London: James Nisbet	Yes	Yes		126	
8	1895	A Prisoner of War: A Story of the Time of Napoleon Bonaparte	London: Blackie	Yes	Yes		288	Robert Barnes
9	1896	Tregarthen	London: Hurst and Blackett	Yes	Yes		3 Vols	
10	1896	Betsy Kitson, etc.	London: National Society's Depository	Yes	No		138	
11	1897	A Dangerous Conspirator (also A Jacobite Conspirator)	London: Jarrold and Son	Yes	Yes	BL	352	Paul Hardy
12	1898	Ralph Denham's Adventures in Burma	Edinburgh: W. P. Nimmo	Yes	Yes	PG	255	
13	1898	Little Marjorie's Secret	London: Religious Tract Society	Yes	No		32	
14	1899	A Roman Household	London: National Society's Depository	Yes	Yes		223	W. S. Stacey
15	1900	Falsely Accused	London: Digby, Long & Co.	Yes	Yes		299	
16	1901	Duance Pendray: A Story of Jacobite Times in Cornwall	London: Jarrold and Son	Yes	Yes		276	W. H. Margetson
17	1901	Riverslea	London: National Society's Depository	Yes	Yes		137	
18	1902	In False Attire: a novel	London: Digby, Long & Co.	Yes	No		320	
19	1902	Willoughby Manor: a Story of Old Liverpool	Edinburgh: W. P. Nimmo	Yes	No		320	
20	1903	Mignonette, etc.	London: National Society's Depository	Yes	No		127	
