= Alice Dudeney =

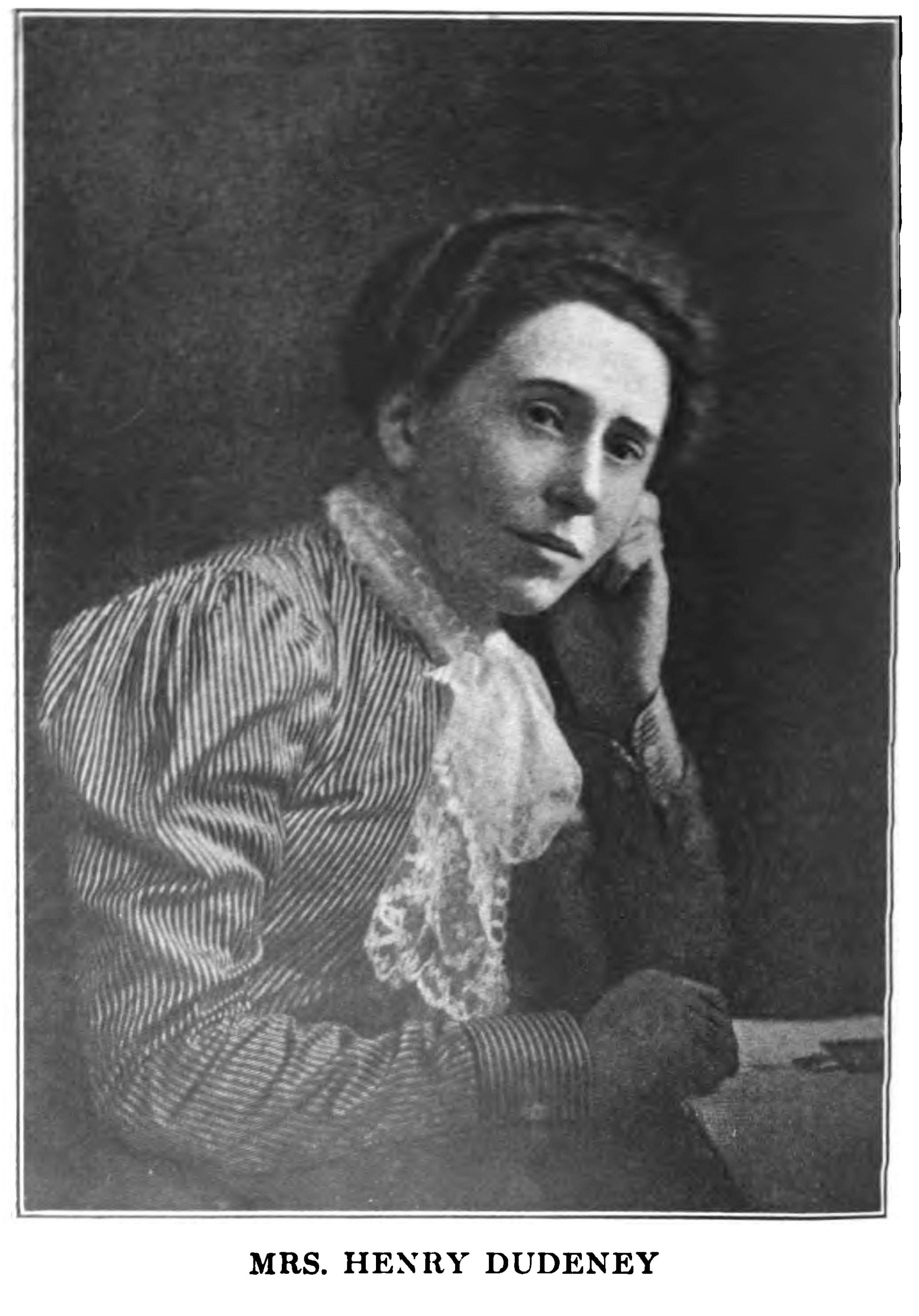
- c. 1912
- Born: Alice Whiffin; 21 October 1866; Brighton, England
- Died: 21 November 1945 (aged 81); Lewes, England
- Occupation: Writer
- Spouse: Henry Dudeney (1884–1930)
- Children: Phyllis Mary (died in infancy) Margery Janet
- Writing career
- Pen name: Alice Dudeney, Mrs. Henry Dudeney
- Genres: Fiction, dramatic fiction, romantic fiction, social commentary

Alice Louisa Dudeney (née Whiffin; 21 October 1866 – 21 November 1945) was an English author and short story writer. The wife of Henry Dudeney, a fellow author and inventor of mathematical puzzles and games, she used the style Mrs. Henry Dudeney for much of her literary career. She herself became a popular writer in her lifetime, who was often compared to Thomas Hardy for her portrayals of Sussex regional life. She had over fifty volumes of fiction published between 1898 and 1937.

== Fiction ==
Called "one of the most powerful writers of fiction among modern English women" by Putnam's Magazine, she is noted for her novels A Man with a Maid (1897), Folly Corner (1899), Maternity of Harriott Wicken (1899), and Spindle and Plough (1901) and was a regular contributor to Harper's Magazine. In 1928, Arthur St. John Adcock wrote, "No woman novelist today writes more objectively or with a stronger imaginative realism in the creation of character and the designing of a story."

Dudeney was best known for her dramatic and romance fiction, though her books frequently touched upon social issues affecting the English working and lower middle classes. She was often touted by her publishers as "the novelist of the Weald and the Marsh and the Down Countries". She is also considered an early Victorian feminist writer, whose popular "marriage-problem" novels, along with those of her contemporary, M. P. Willcocks, showed female characters who were often frustrated with problems in their own marriages.

== Diary ==
In 1998, author Diana Crook edited and published Dudeney's personal diaries, entitling them A Lewes Diary: 1916–1944. These describe her life in Lewes with Henry Dudeney before and during the interwar years. The book's success brought renewed interest in her work and resulted in several of her novels being reprinted in 2008 and 2009.

== Biography ==
Alice Dudeney was born to Frederick Whiffin, a master tailor, and his wife Susan Howe in Brighton on 21 October 1866. She was educated in Hurstpierpoint, a part of Sussex which she would use as a setting for her later novels, and later introduced to 25-year-old Henry Dudeney through a mutual friend. The two were married at St. Andrew Church, Holborn, London on 3 November 1884.

The couple rented a house in Great James Street, Bedford Row, close to the printing houses. Dudeney, then an aspiring writer, wrote a few short stories intended for publication, but much of her time was taken up as a housewife and expectant mother. Their first child, Phyllis Mary, was born in May 1887, but died aged four months.

Distraught over the loss of their baby, Dudeney stopped writing for a time and took a job as assistant secretary to the head of the Cassells publishing firm, Sir Wemyss Reid. The literary atmosphere of Cassells eventually prompted her to return to writing and would later launch her career as a novelist, by way of three short stories that appeared in Cassell journals. Her connections with Cassells also gave Henry another outlet for his work.

The couple's second child, Margery Janet, was born in 1890. They decided to move away from London to a rented cottage near the Surrey/Sussex border, in a small hamlet north of Billingshurst. There they found themselves preferring life in the countryside. After some years they were able to purchase a three-acre plot of land on the outskirts of Horsell. With the help of Henry's brother-in-law, Maurice Pocock, then living with his wife, Kate Dudeney, in nearby Chertsey, they planned the construction of a country estate named Littlewick Meadow in 1897. The house was so large that they hired several servants to help them run it. Having a common interest in antique furniture, they also attended sales in the local area and furnished their home with a unique collection of Jacobean and later period antiques.

Much of Dudeney's personal life could be described as very domestic. In her entry in Who's Who her hobbies were listed as "gardening and collecting old oak furniture". She was also involved in the restoration of nearby historic homes that had fallen into disrepair.

In 1897, Dudeney published her first novel, A Man with a Maid. Much of her early work was dramatic fiction dealing with then controversial moral topics, such as illegitimate pregnancy) and domestic life among the working and lower middle classes. Folly Corner (1899) tells of a young woman who moves from London to live on an ancestral Sussex farm and becomes involved in a bigamous relationship. Maternity of Harriott Wicken (1899) is a murder story that ends with the death of a mother and her child from measles. Men of Marlowe's (1900) is a collection of bohemian short stories set in Gray's Inn, London. The Third Floor (1901) follows another young girl living alone in London, who becomes a victim of sexual abuse.

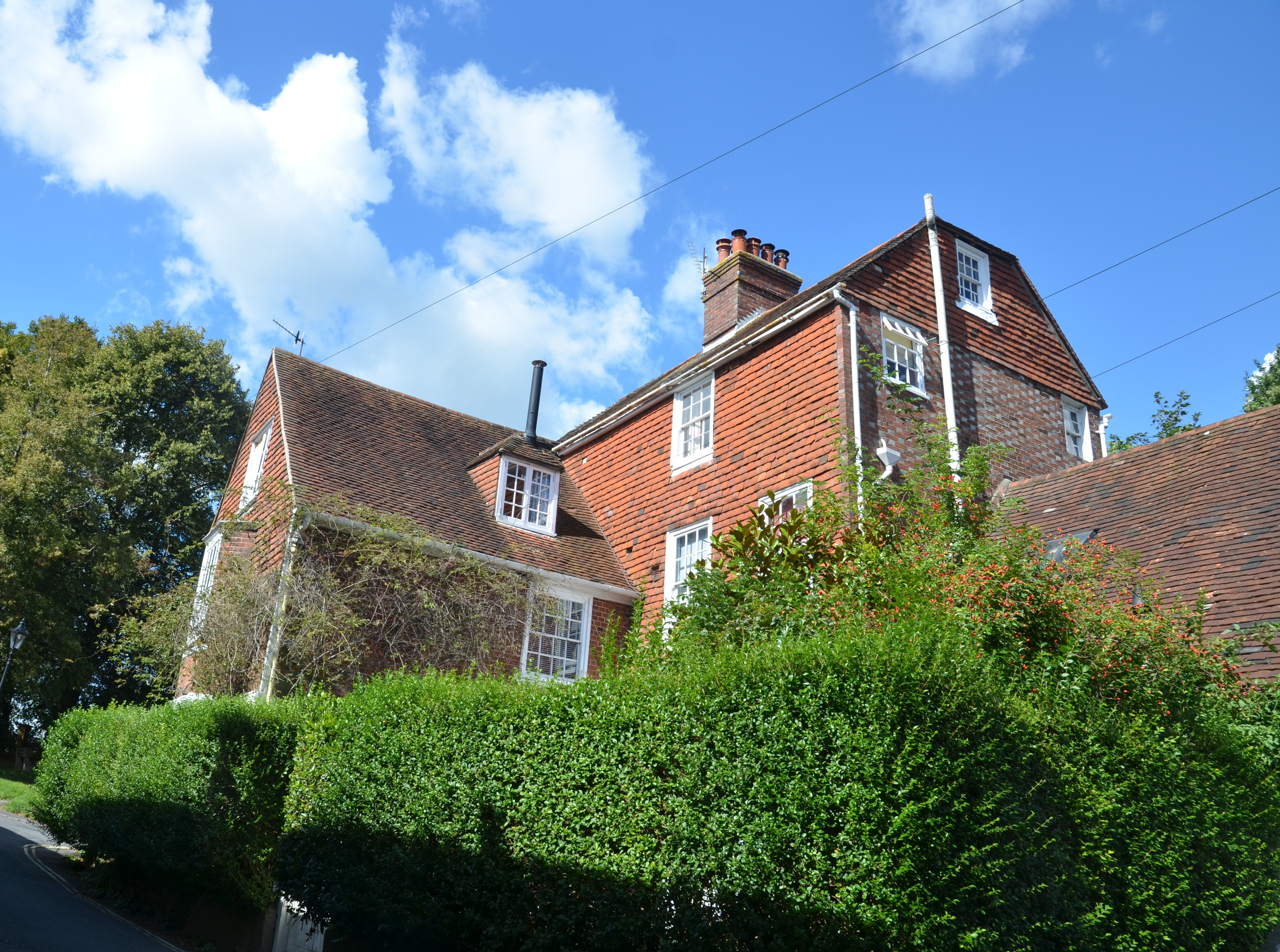
Brack Mound House, Lewes, formerly called Castle Precincts House, where Dudeney lived from 1916.

As Dudeney's success as a writer grew, the money from her writing provided much of the family income. By the turn of the 20th century, her popularity had gained her and Henry entry into both literary and court circles. In 1912, her literary work was profiled by Frederic Taber Cooper in Some English Story Tellers: A Book of the Younger Novelists. She was a regular guest of Sir Philip Sassoon and his sister Sybil at their home in Port Lympne. Her novel Head of the Family (1917) was dedicated to Philip at his request, and she often received personal presents from him. She later donated a series of letters from Philip to her, to Cecil Roth for his book The Sassoon Dynasty. Marital troubles, including an affair with the artist Paul Hardy, caused Alice to separate from Henry, which prompted the sale of Littlewick. They were eventually reconciled after their daughter Margery Janet's marriage and emigration to Canada, and moved to Castle Precincts House, Lewes in 1916. However, between 1911 and 1916, she resided at The Pigeon House in the High Street, Angmering.

In 1920, Alice Dudeney was given an honourable mention, along with a number of other non-American authors, who were excluded by American Society of Arts and Sciences from receiving the O. Henry Memorial Award. Her 1929 novel The Peep Show was adapted into a Broadway show by playwright Elsie Schauffler.

After Henry's death in 1930, Dudeney remained in Lewes and continued writing up until 1937. She died on 21 November 1945, after suffering a stroke, and was buried alongside her husband in Lewes town cemetery. Their grave is marked by a copy of an 18th-century Sussex sandstone obelisk, which Alice had copied after Henry's death to serve as a memorial to them both.

Over 50 years after her death, Alice's personal diaries were edited by Diana Crook and published in 1998. The book, entitled A Lewes Diary: 1916–1944, describes her sometimes troubled married life with Henry Dudeney during their 30-year residence in Lewes. Several anecdotes were used in later books of wartime diaries. The success of this book resulted in several of her stories being reprinted, including Spindle and Plough, Men of Marlowe's and Robin Brilliant in 2008 and The Maternity of Harriott Wicken, Rachel Lorian, The Story of Susan, Trespass, A Large Room, The Battle of the Weak, Or, Gossips Green and Folly Corner in 2009.

== Bibliography ==
- A Man with a Maid (1897)
- Hagar of Homerton (1898)
- The Maternity of Harriott Wicken (1899)
- Folly Corner (1899)
- Men of Marlowe's (1900)
- Spindle and Plough (1901)
- The Third Floor (1901)
- Robin Brilliant (1902)
- The Story of Susan (1903)
- The Wise Woods (1905)
- A Country Bunch (1905)
- The Battle of the Weak, or, Gossips Green (1906)
- The Orchard Thief (1907)
- Rachel Lorian (1908)
- Trespass (1909)
- A Sense of Scarlet and Other Stories (1909)
- The Shoulder-Knot (1909)
- A Large Room (1910)
- Married When Suited (1911)
- Maid's Money (1911)
- A Runaway Ring (1913)
- Set To Partners: A Novel (1914)
- The Secret Son (1915)
- This Way Out (1917)
- The Head of the Family (1917)
- Thumb Nails (1918)
- Candlelight (1918)
- What a Woman Wants (1914)
- The Next Move (1924)
- The Play Box (1924)
- Quince Alley (1925)
- Seed Pods (1927)
- Brighton Beach (1928)
- Puff Paste (1928)
- By Consent (1929)
- The Peep Show (1929)
- Traveller's Rest (1930)
- The House in the High Street (1931)
- The Treasure Field (1932)
- Puzzles and curious problems (1932, co-authored with Henry Dudeney)
- Trundle Square (1933)
- Portrait of Ellen (1934)
- Put Up The Shutters (1935)
- Barbourbrook (1935)
- Petty Cash (1937)
- A Lewes Diary, 1916–1944 (1998, published posthumously)
