= James Hardy Jnr. =

Former British artist

James Hardy junior
- Photograph, 1863
- Born: 14 November 1832; Brighton, Sussex
- Died: 24 July 1889 (aged 56); Virginia Water, Surrey
- Known for: Sporting and genre pictures

James Hardy junior (14 November 1832 – 24 July 1889) was a British artist, in particular a painter of sporting dogs and Scottish sporting pictures. He also painted genre scenes set in cottage interiors or the countryside.

== Early life ==
James Hardy junior was born on 14 November 1832 at Brighton in Sussex, the eldest of ten children of the artist James Hardy senior (1801 – 1879) and his wife Elizabeth. Before he became an artist his father was Principal Trumpet in the Private Band of Music of King George IV. Other artists in the family included James's brothers, David and Heywood, his sister Ada and his cousins, Frederick Daniel Hardy and George Hardy. James's ancestors were from Horsforth in Yorkshire; Gathorne Gathorne-Hardy, First Earl of Cranbrook, was his second cousin.

When he was a boy his family moved from Brighton to Lewes, then to Chichester and finally to Bath where young James had a studio on the first floor of the Hardy family house at 30 Henrietta Street. He received encouraging comments about his first exhibits, studies of game birds that were shown at the Bath Graphic Society in 1852.

== Sporting dogs and genre scenes ==
James Hardy junior's early subjects were mainly game birds painted in watercolours and in oils. In 1854 he painted his first pictures of sporting dogs, which he exhibited at the Society of British Artists; The Art Journal's reviewer wrote, "There is in this composition the head of a pointer, which is accurately drawn, skilfully painted, and strikingly characteristic. It is a sporting picture painted with clearness and decision". Though Hardy's skills as an artist of sporting pictures were increasingly well recognised, during the 1850s and 1860s he also painted numerous genre scenes of cottage interiors.

Despite early promise, it appears that Hardy found it difficult to make a living as an artist in Bath. In March 1859, it was reported that "James Hardy, jun., artist, of Henrietta Street, passed his first examination as an insolvent debtor unopposed. The debts amounted to about £240; but there were assets to the amount of £50, available for creditors." Later in 1859 James left his parents' home in Bath and removed to Bristol (to 4 Lower Church Lane).

On 18 October 1860 Hardy married Laura Amelia May, the daughter of Enoch May, a pharmacist who lived at Tewkesbury in Gloucestershire; they lived for about a year with her family and then removed to Bristol (to Bedford Villa in Terrell Street).

In the Field - A Spaniel (1883)

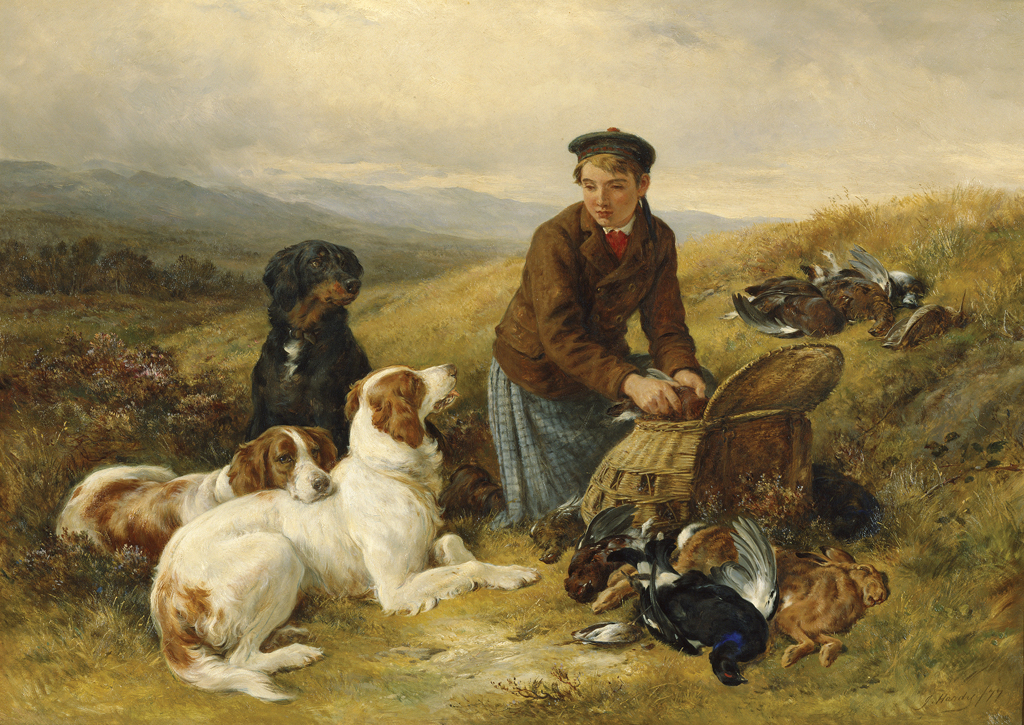
A young gillie with setters and dead game (1877)

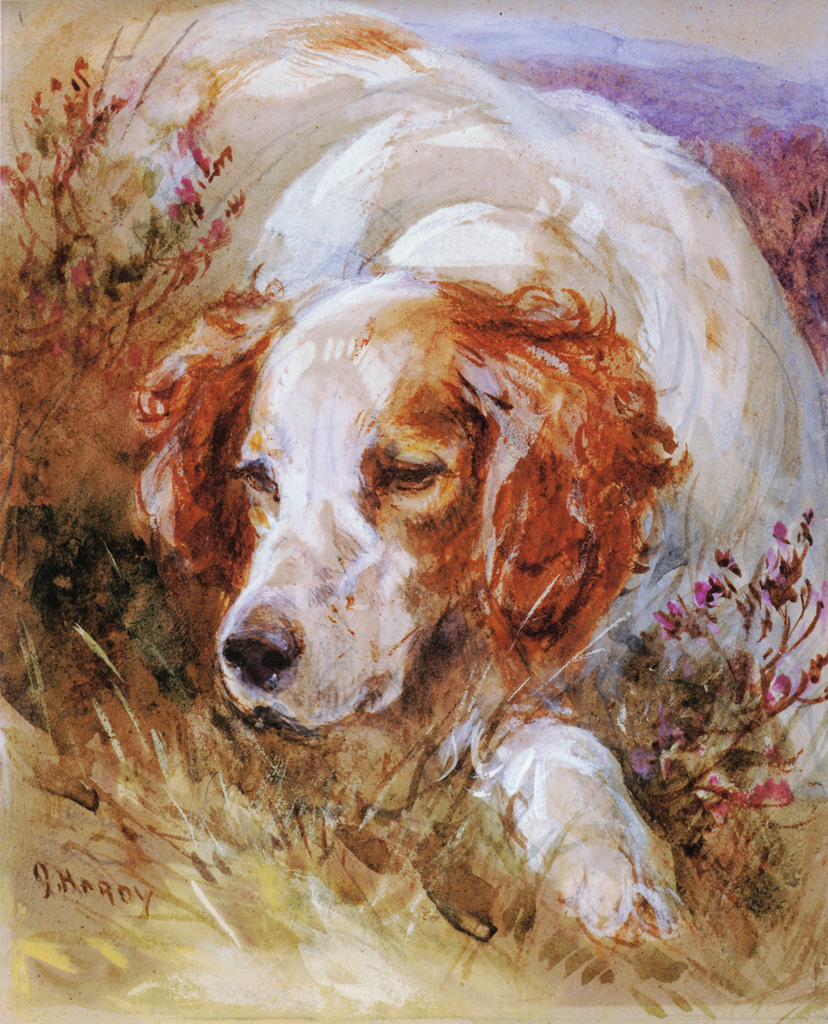
A Spaniel

== Scottish sporting pictures ==
In 1869 Hardy painted the first of his Scottish landscapes, with gillies and Gordon and English setters, for which he is most famous. His brother Heywood was an expert animal painter and they collaborated on a few pictures at this time; it is possible that Heywood helped James to become a successful painter of sporting scenes set in Scottish landscapes. After 1870 James no longer painted genre pictures, but concentrated almost exclusively on Scottish scenes. He lived in Bristol until 1870 when he removed to London with his wife, two sons and two daughters.

James exhibited nine paintings at the Royal Academy between 1862 and 1886 and 45 paintings at the Society of British Artists between 1853 and 1871. He was elected an associate of the Institute of Painters in Water Colours in 1874 and a member in 1877. He was elected to the Royal Institute of Oil Painters in 1883 and the Royal West of England Academy in 1889.

Hardy's best pictures were painted in the 1870s. Arguably his best painting is A Young Gillie, with Setters and Dead Game (1877) which is in the Royal Holloway Collection. It was bought by Thomas Holloway at Christie's in 1883 (William Lee's sale). A reviewer of the Royal Holloway Collection wrote that the dogs in the painting were "beautifully painted, and the sincere friendship between the Gillie and his beautiful dogs, which it is almost an insult to call "dumb animals", makes the painting doubly interesting. Hardy died on 24 July 1889 ("exhaustion from melancholia" was the cause of death) at the Holloway Sanatorium, near Virginia Water, Surrey.
