= Heywood Hardy =

British painter (1842–1933)

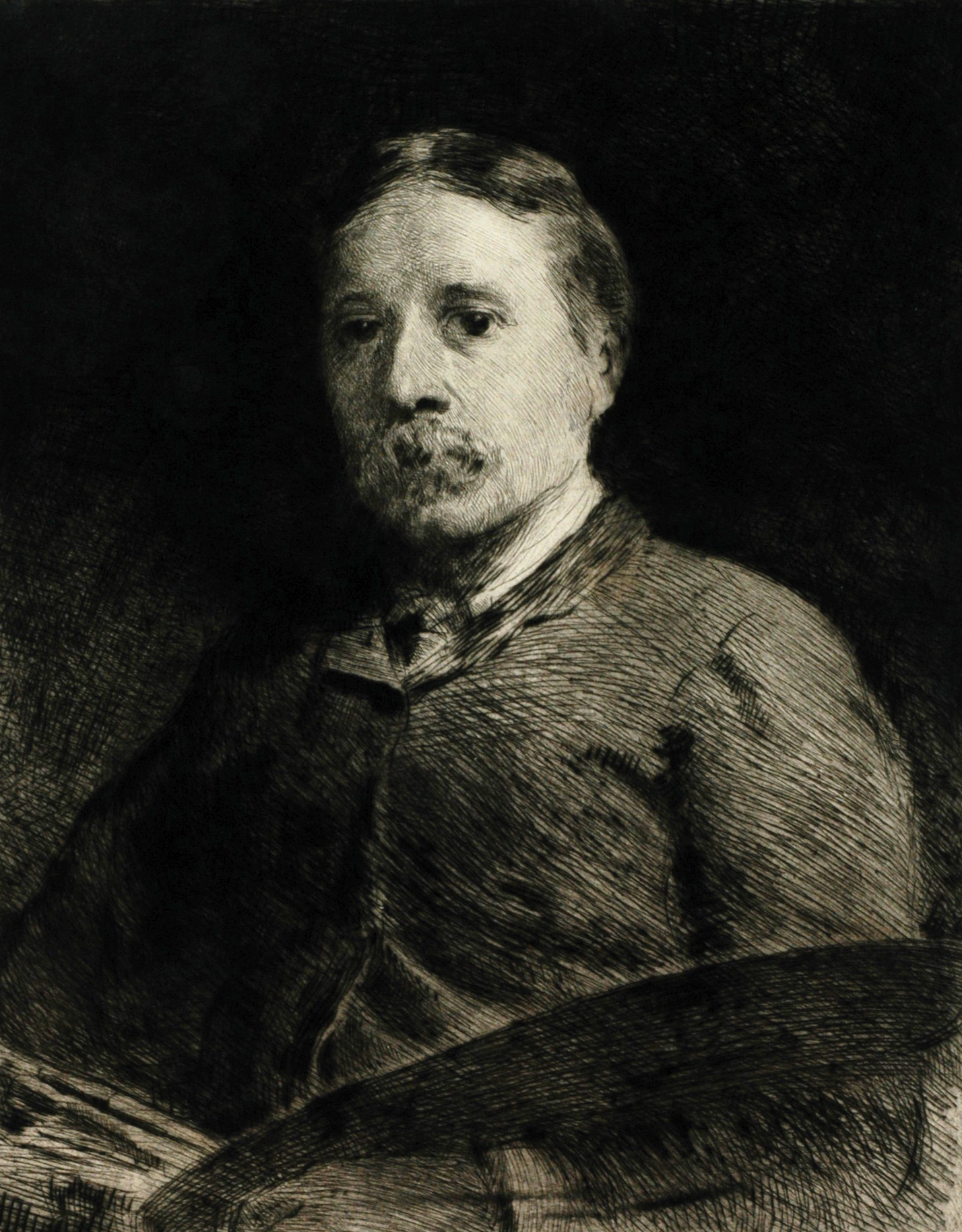
- Portrait by Frank Holl RA, 1884
- Born: 25 November 1842; Chichester, Sussex, England
- Died: 20 January 1933 (aged 90); Epsom, Surrey, England
- Known for: Animal painting. Paintings of horse riding and hunting. Equestrian portraits

Heywood Hardy (25 November 1842 – 20 January 1933) was a British artist, in particular an animal painter and painter of horse riding scenes. He also painted landscapes and portraits, especially equestrian portraits.

== Early life ==
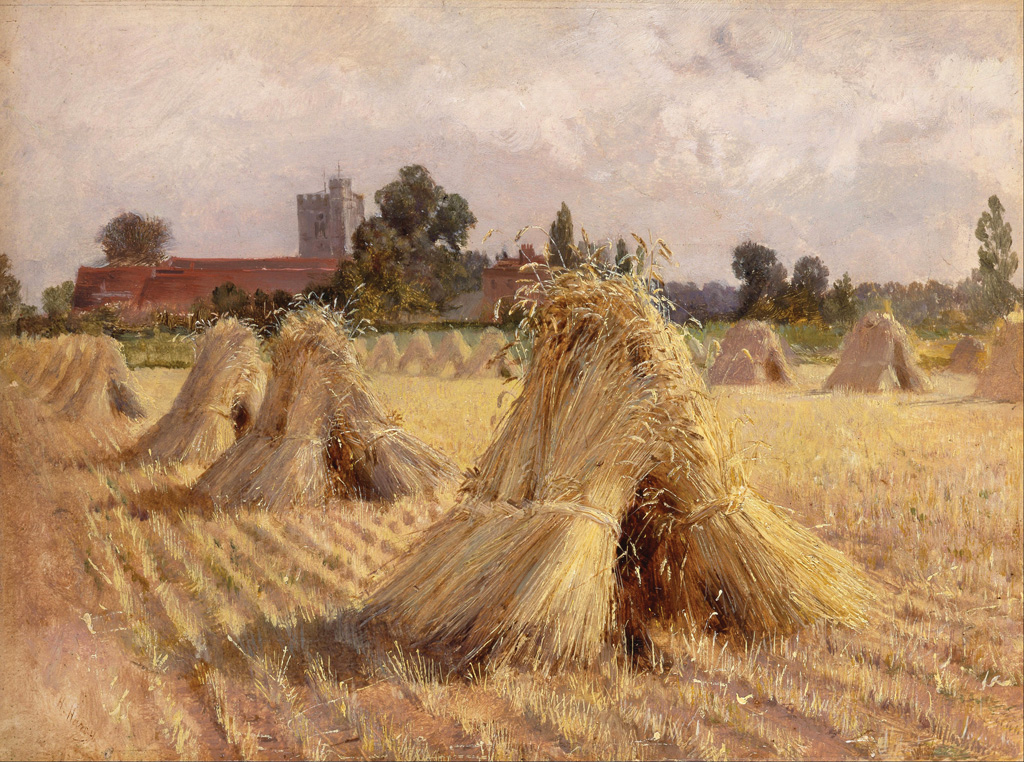
Corn Stooks by Bray Church (1872)

Heywood Hardy was born on 25 November 1842 at Chichester in Sussex, the youngest of ten children of the artist James Hardy senior (1801 – 1879) and his wife Elizabeth. Before he became an artist his father was Principal Trumpet in the Private Band of Music of King George IV. Other artists in the family included Heywood's elder brothers, James junior and David, his sister Ada and his cousins, Frederick Daniel Hardy and George Hardy. Heywood's ancestors were from Horsforth in Yorkshire; Gathorne Gathorne-Hardy, First Earl of Cranbrook, was his second cousin.

When he was 17 years old Heywood Hardy left the family home in Bath after an argument with his quick-tempered father and removed to Keynsham near Bristol. His first two paintings, landscapes, were accepted for exhibition at The Royal Academy in 1864 In the same year he was appointed an Ensign in the 7th Somersetshire Rifle Volunteer Corps, a part-time position. Later that year he left Keynsham to study at the École des Beaux-Arts in Paris where his principal teacher was Isidore Pils. Hardy spent much of his spare time copying paintings in the Louvre.

After his years of bohemianism in Paris, Heywood returned to England via Antwerp and by 1869 was living at Goring in Oxfordshire, near the bridge over the Thames.

== Animal painting ==
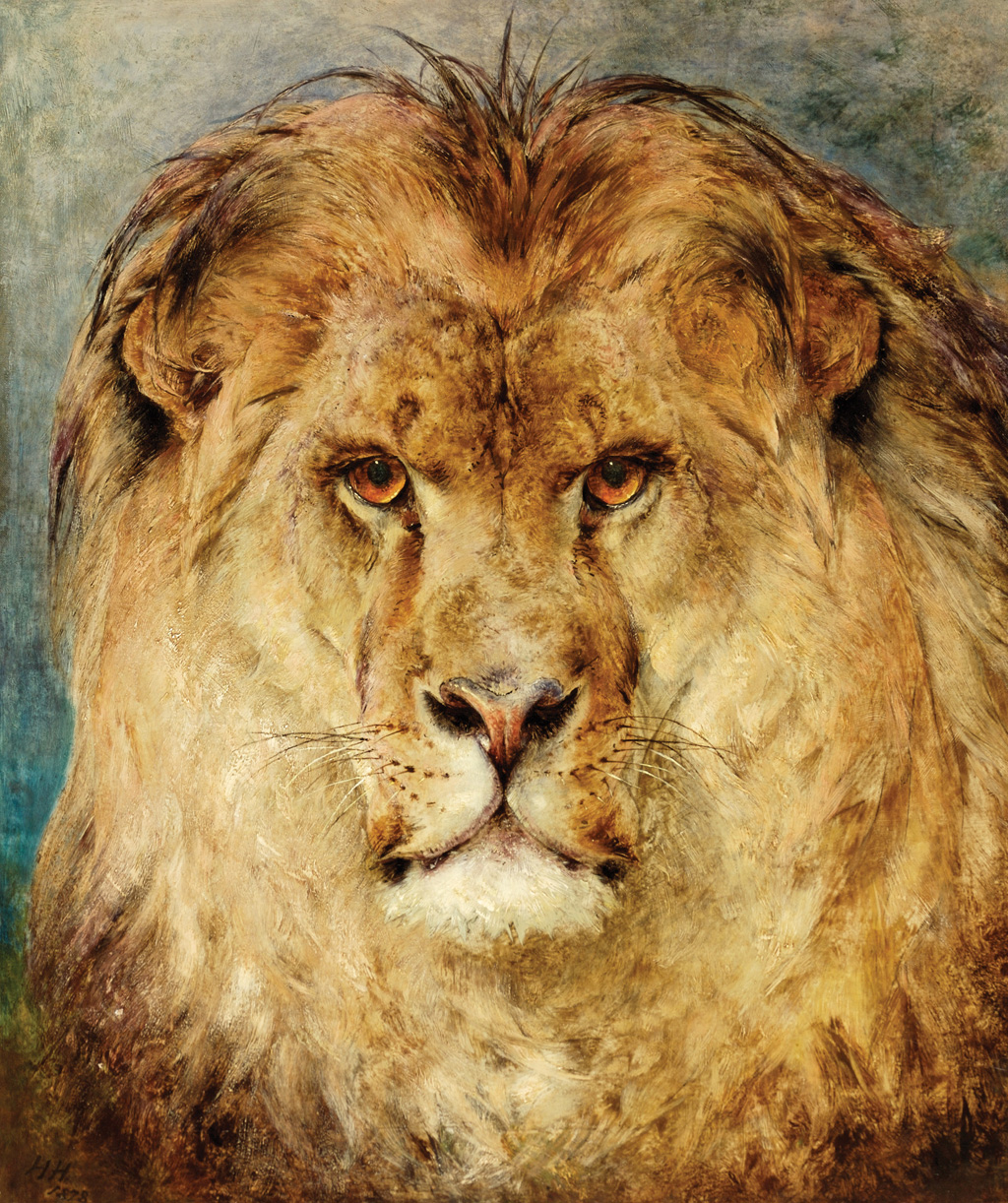
A Lion's Head (1878)

In 1870 Hardy removed to St John's Wood in London and established himself as an animal painter. In 1873 The Times commented on his picture of fighting lions exhibited at The Royal Academy, "...we do not remember such a daring and determined piece of savage animal painting from an English hand – few from any hand since Rubens. The picture at once gives a great rise in artistic rank to the artist."

Hardy visited Egypt in 1873 to paint wildlife. In London he studied the comparative anatomy of animals and birds with Professor Alfred Henry Garrod, Head of the Scientific Department at the London Zoo. He also made illustrations for Garrod's research on the horse gait. To assist his studies of lions, Hardy acquired a lioness that had died at the London Zoo and had it mounted by Rowland Ward, one of the foremost taxidermists of his day.

== Horses and equestrian portraits ==
Horses and horse riding were the subjects of much of Hardy’s later work. His pictures of horse riding by the seashore and riders in 18th century settings are among his most popular paintings. Hardy painted three winners of the Grand National for their owners. He was much in demand to paint equestrian portraits and pictures of the most famous Hunts and foxhounds of his day. Notable portraits include that of Lady Ida Sitwell; her husband Sir George Sitwell commissioned it as a wedding present.

In 1909 Heywood Hardy returned to live in Sussex, at East Preston, a few minutes walk from the beach. His last paintings were altarpieces for the thirteenth century Church of St Mary at Clymping in Sussex and for St Luke’s Church at the Royal Hospital Haslar, Gosport. Hardy’s ashes were buried at Clymping Church.

Heywood Hardy was a founder member of the Royal Society of Portrait Painters, a founder member of the Royal Society of Painter-Etchers, a member of the Royal Institute of Oil Painters, and an Associate of the Royal Watercolour Society.

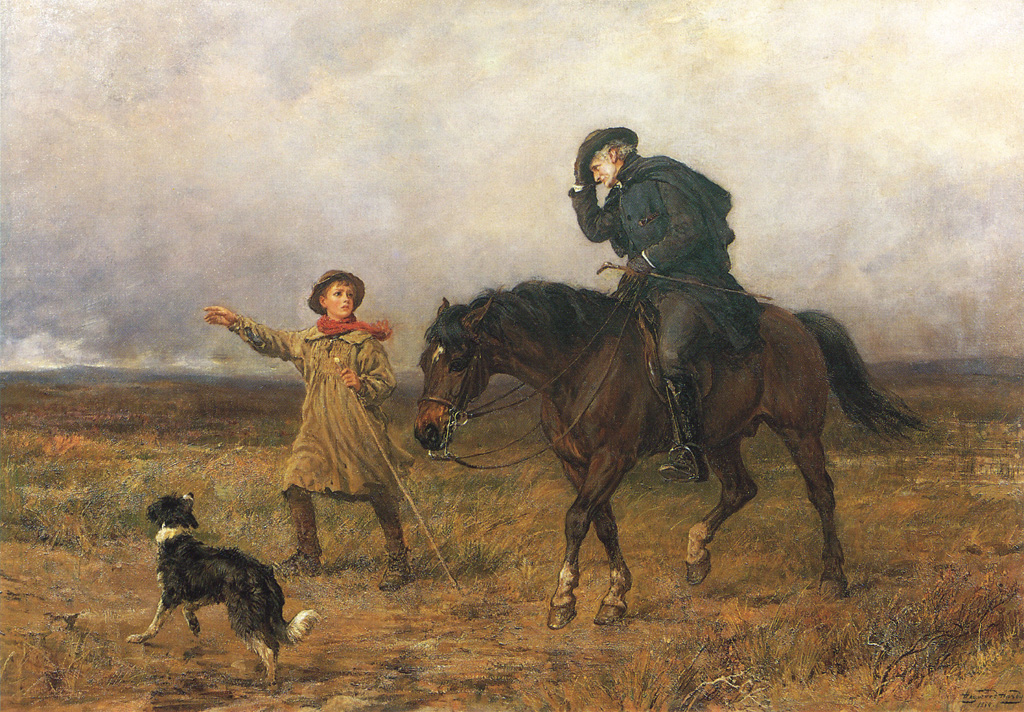
Duty (1880)

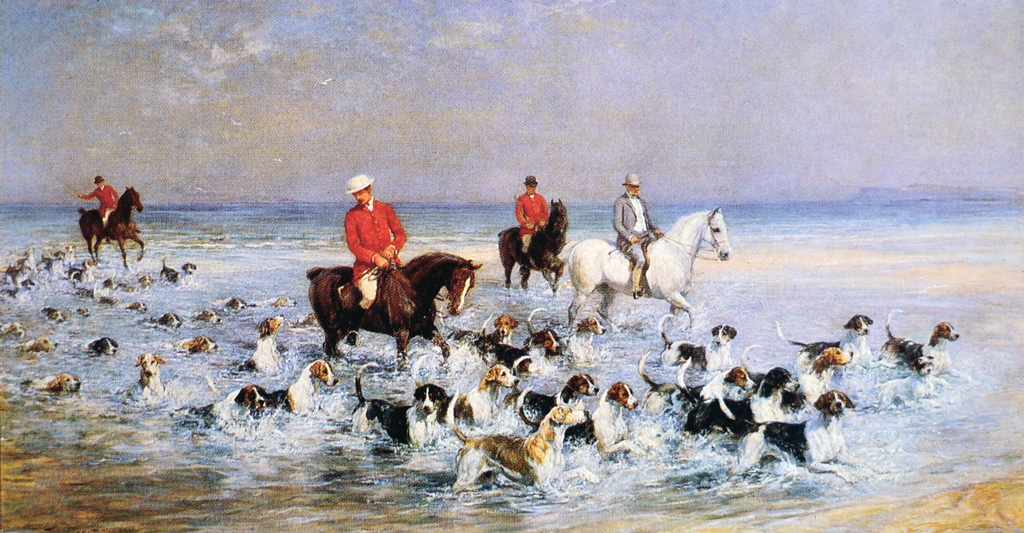
A Summer's Day in Cleveland (1889)

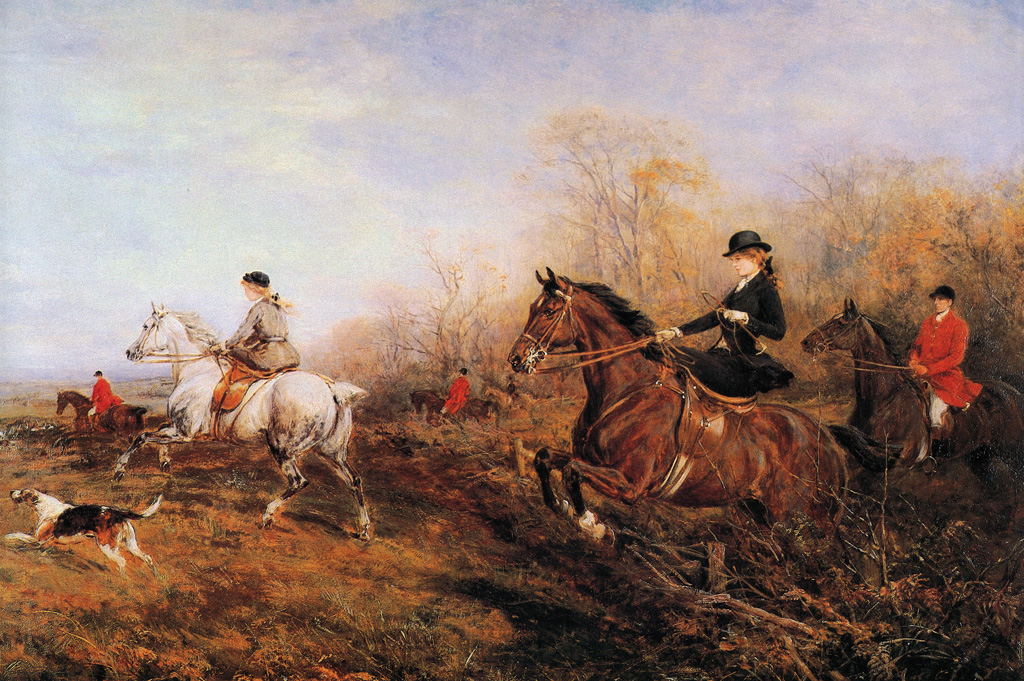
Out for a Scamper (ca. 1900)

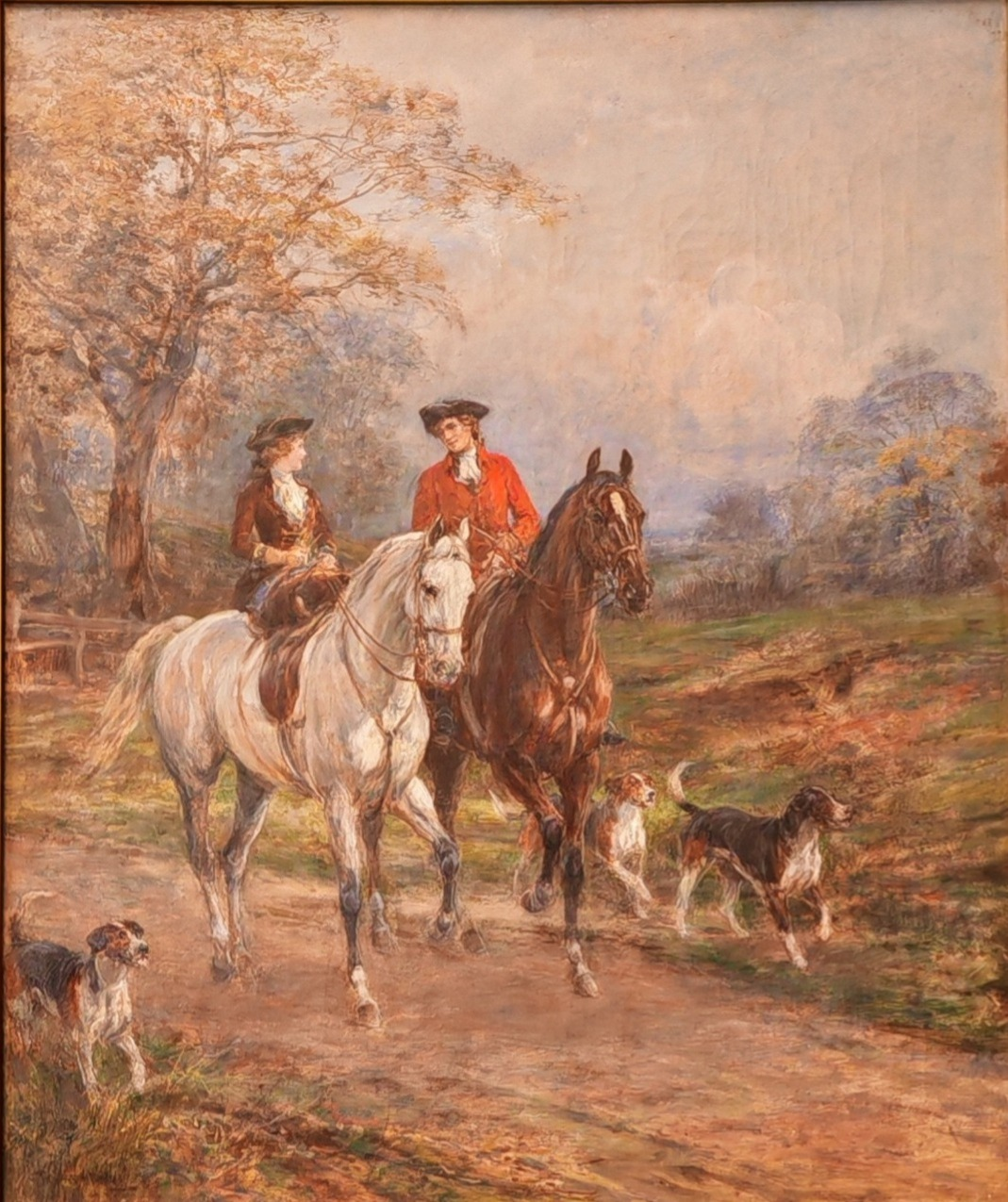
Homewards. Oil on canvas. Signed Heywood Hardy (lower left). The title inscribed verso

== Family and music ==
Heywood's father was originally a musician and three uncles played in the Royal Private Band of Music, including his uncle William Hardy who was Conductor of Queen Adelaide’s Private Band. Heywood played the zither, mandolin and English guitar. He often participated in musical evenings, as a singer and musician, in the country houses that he visited to paint portraits and pictures of horses and dogs.

In 1868 Hardy married Mary Beechey, daughter of Rear-Admiral Frederick William Beechey, FRS, President of the Royal Geographical Society. There were several artists in Mary’s family; her grandfather was the artist Sir William Beechey.

Two of Hardy’s four daughters were artists. His eldest daughter, Nina, exhibited 15 paintings at the Royal Academy, mostly portraits of women and children. And Mabel Hardy, who was always known as “Beldy”, a blend of Mabel and Hardy, was an artist and musician who won first prize for her studies at the Paris Conservatory. Beldy married Charles Ormond Maugham, elder brother of writer Somerset Maugham and partner in the family law firm in Paris. Beldy’s daughter, Daphne Maugham Casorati, and her grandson, Francesco Casorati, were artists.
