= Charles Brock =

Charles Brock may refer to:

- C. E. Brock (1870–1938), British artist
- Charles Thomas Brock Sangster (1872–1935), British engineer and industrialist
- Charley Brock (1916–1987), American football player
- Edmond Brock (1882–1952), British painter
