= Edmond Brock =

English 20th century painter

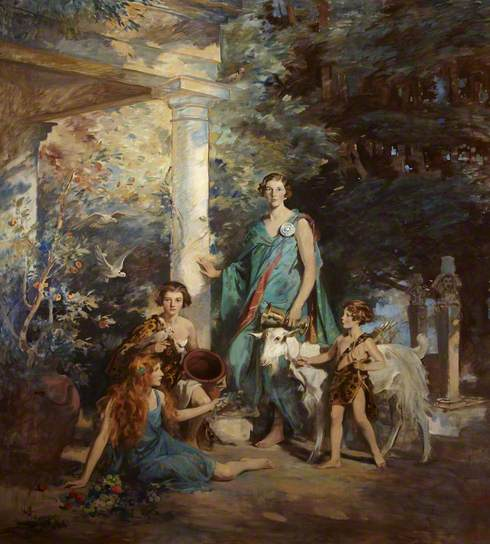
Circe and the Sirens, A Group Portrait of the Honourable Edith Chaplin (1878–1959), Marchioness of Londonderry, and Her Three Youngest Daughters

Charles Edmond Brock (1882–1952), known as Edmond Brock, was an English painter and illustrator best known for his portraits of society and royal figures.

The youngest son of the sculptor Sir Thomas Brock (1847–1922), Edmond Brock was born in London and educated at Bedford School. His gifts as a portrait painter were apparent from an early age and he began exhibiting portraits of prominent society figures at the Royal Academy from 1903 when still only 20. He exhibited over 50 portraits there up until the late 1930s. Brock also travelled to America several times to paint sitters such as Beatrice, Countess of Granard, Ogden Mills and Marshall Field.

Brock's most prominent patron was the political hostess Lady Londonderry, for whom he painted numerous family portraits which can still be seen in the National Trust Collection at Mount Stewart. In 1928 he also illustrated a children's book The Magic Inkpot by Lady Londonderry. Lady Londonderry's closeness to Ramsay MacDonald may have been responsible for Brock's commission to paint his portrait, which was exhibited at the Royal Academy in 1935, the last portrait of MacDonald as Prime Minister as he resigned a month later.

Brock's royal patrons included the Duke and Duchess of York, for whom he painted portraits of their daughters Elizabeth and Margaret Rose (exhibited at the Royal Academy in 1932 and 1935), as well as the group portrait Her Royal Highness the Duchess of York and Her Children Princess Elizabeth and Princess Margaret Rose. Brock painted several portraits of Princess Elizabeth before her eighth birthday and went on to paint several others of her sister Princess Margaret. In a letter to the artist from 1952, the Queen acknowledges that her father, King George VI, held the portraits of her and her sister in very high esteem and always had one in his sitting room at Buckingham Palace.

Edmond Brock did not exhibit after 1938 and died in 1952 at the age of 70.

== Confusion over name ==
Edmond was christened 'Charles Edmond'. By an unfortunate coincidence, there was another artist called Charles Edmund Brock (1870–1938) who was exhibiting at the Royal Academy at the same time.

To avoid confusion between two artists with virtually identical names the older Brock agreed to use the name "Charles" and drop "Edmund", while the younger Brock would use "Edmond" and omit "Charles".
