= William Heysham Overend =

English artist and illustrator

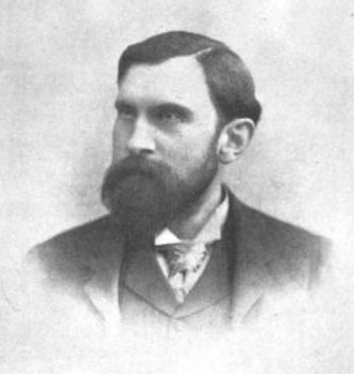
- Born: 5 October 1851; Coatham Mundeville, County Durham
- Died: 18 March 1898 (aged 46); London, England
- Other name: WHO
- Occupations: Artist and illustrator
- Years active: 1872–1898
- Known for: Marine art
- Notable work: An August Morning with Farragut: The Battle of Mobile Bay

William Heysham Overend ROI (5 October 1851 – 18 March 1898) was an English artist and illustrator who specialised in marine art.

== Early life ==
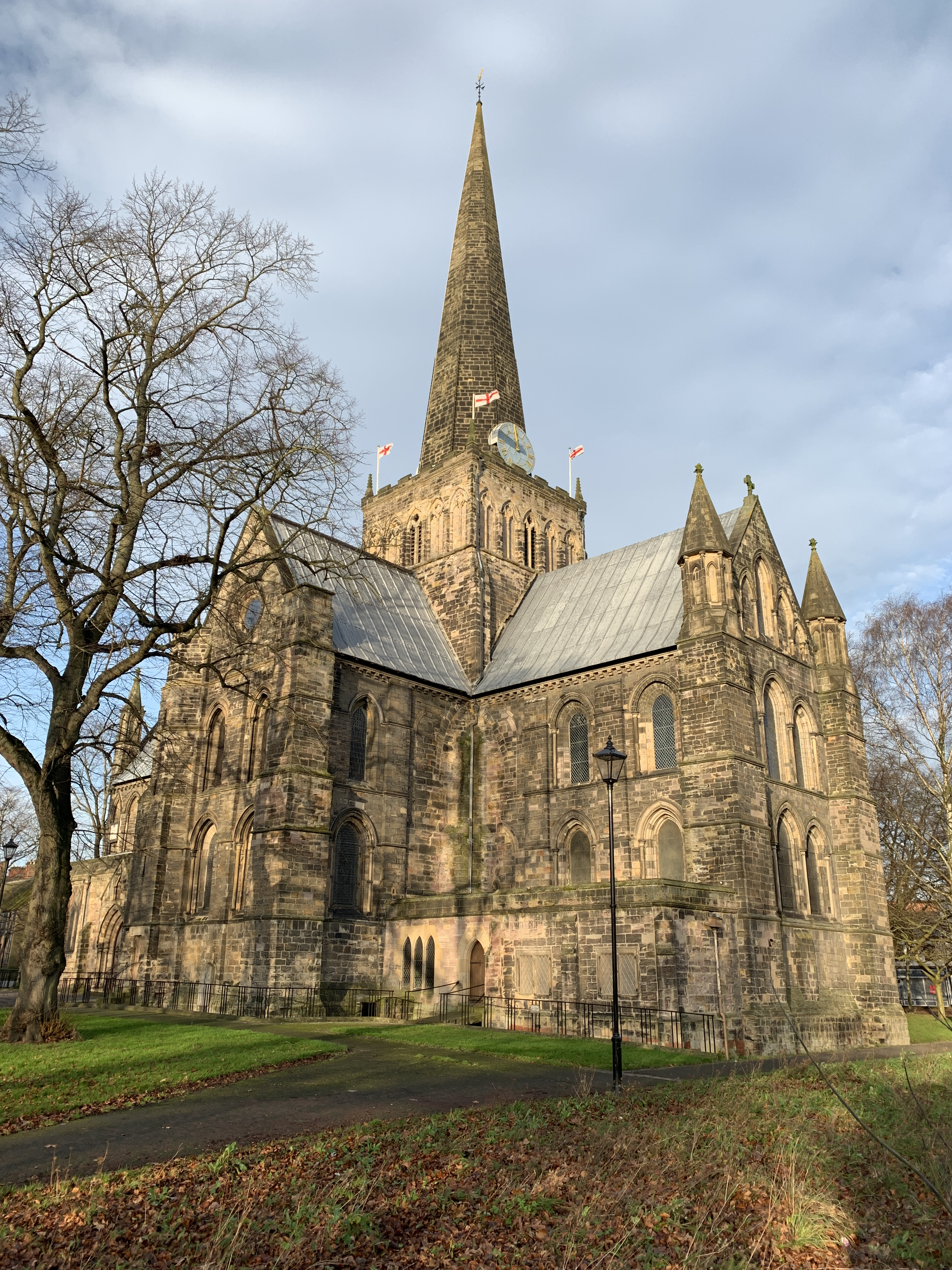
St Cuthbert's Church, Darlington

William Heysham Overend (Note: The Royal Museums Greenwich note that his second name is variously given as Heysham, Huysman, Heysman or Heysmann. However, his name if very clearly written Heysham on the Civil Registration Birth Index for Quarter four of 1851.) was born on 5 October 1851 in Coatham, County Durham. Many sources state that his birthplace was Coatham, North Yorkshire near Middlesbrough. However, it seems more likely that his birthplace was Coatham Mundeville near Darlington, as:

- His birth was registered in Darlington, Durham.
- He was baptised in St Cuthbert's Church, Darlington, less than 6.5 km from Coatham Mundeville.
- He and his parents gave Darlington as his birthplace on census returns.
- Mayhew's statement that he was born miles inland (Coatham in Yorkshire is on the coast).

His parents were James Overend (1821 – 2 November 1875), a flax spinner, born in Bentham, Yorkshire, and Martha née Hodgson (1824–1886), born in Hawkshead, Lancashire and the daughter of Braithwaite Hodgson, a wealthy landowner. The family lived in Priestgate, Darlington in the 1850s, but the 1861 census found them living at No, 2, Buccleuch Terrace, Hackney. By now, his father was a railway contractor. (Note: His father died in 1875 and his mother returned to Lancashire where she was living with her sister in the 1881 census.)

Overend was educated at both Charterhouse School, where he only spent one year, and Bruce Castle School, where he remained until 1867. He was already showing early promise as Athol states that a sketch drawn by him at age 14, of a boarding party, would not have disgraced a student of the Royal Academy.

After leaving Bruce Castle School in the summer of 1857, Overend spend the next three years in the studio of Davis Cooper, son of Abraham Cooper RA. Here he went through the traditional course of art training, but continued to teach himself after leaving the studio. By 1871, he was a lodger, with the profession of artist (painter), together with Edward Overend, an unemployed Naval Engineer, in a small lodging house at 14 Clapton Terrace in Hackney, London.

== Work ==
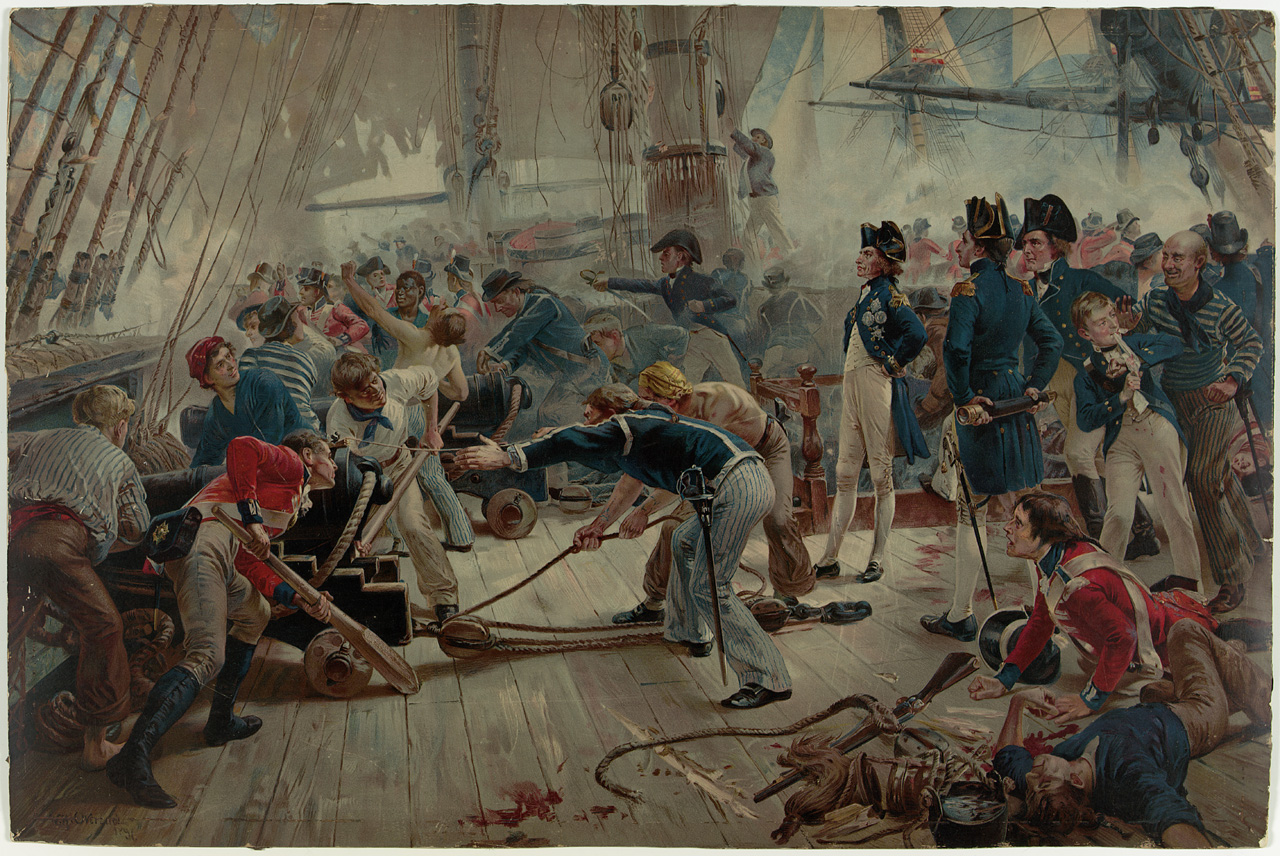
The Hero of Trafalgar, 21 October 1805 (c. 1891). This painting was displayed posthumously in the Royal Academy in 1898.

Overend found it difficult at first to earn his living as a painter. His first successful submission to the Royal Academy was in 1872, and by 1880 he had exhibited twice with both the Royal Academy and the Society of British Artists. He continued to exhibit throughout his life, including at the Royal Academy, The Society of British Artists, the Royal Society of Painters in Oils, Liverpool, Glasgow, 1891 Naval Exhibition, and the 1883 World Columbian Exhibition. (Note: Johnson and Greutzner list his exhibitions since 1880 as follows: one work at the Dudley Gallery and New Dudley Gallery, two works at the Glasgow Institute of the Fine Arts, one work at the Walker Art Gallery, Liverpool, nine works at the Royal Academy, and five works at the Royal Institute of Oil Painters. These were in addition to the two oil paintings he had exhibited at the Royal Academy and the two oil paintings he had shown at Suffolk Street, the headquarters of the then Society of British Artists by 1880.)

Beginning as a painter, Overend moved into illustration. His connection with the Illustrated London News began in 1875 when he illustrated the Sir George Nares Arctic expedition. For the next decade at least he was second only to Richard Caton Woodville as an illustrator for the paper. Overend also illustrated articles in The English Illustrated Magazine from 1891, Good Words from 1894, The Rambler from 1897, The Pall Mall Magazine, and the juvenile periodicals The Boy's Own Paper, and Chums from 1892, Overend also drew for The Illustrated Naval and Military Magazine, The Graphic, The Magazine of Art, and The Leisure Hour, London Society, St. Nicholas, and The Penny Illustrated Paper.

Overend's work was characterised by thoroughness. He maintained a stock of uniforms and weapons to serve as models for his drawings. During the 1891 Naval Exhibition at Chelsea (2 May 1891 – October 1891) he loaned the following to the exhibition from his collection:

- 9 assorted Naval officers swords and Midshipmen's dirks
- A 1:48 scale model of a Frigate
- 9 assorted Naval and Marine coats and hats
- Various paintings including a coloured sheet of 12 figures in Navy costumes for 1854

Overend was not just an artist, but an engraver. He records his occupation as steel engraver (Note: The enumerator seems to have added the words Sculptor to the profession or occupation. It appears that this was one of the standard occupations and one sees the same correction for other artists in the census.) in the 1891 census. Newbolt notes that Overend probably carved the woodcuts for some of his illustrations, including for the six illustrations for G. A. Henty's A Chapter of Adventures.

Overend was elected a member of the Royal Institute of Painters in Oils on 27 January 1886. He was elected to the Council of the Navy Records Society in 1897. These two elections illustrate that his work was recognised not only by his artistic peers, but also by naval historians.

A painting by Overend and Lionel Smythe of a rugby union football game drew notable interest from intrigued crowds at The Exposition Universelle de 1889 in Paris. The work, which depicts the 1886 Scotland-England rugby union match, is now lost.

=== Ship illustrations ===
One of the strangest things about Overend is that he was a landsman, bred and born. He was born miles from the coast, and had no relatives in either the merchant or naval service, yet his knowledge of past and present ships of war was matched by few sailors. The following illustrations were drawn by Overend for the Illustrated Naval and Military Magazine in 1884 for articles on the development of naval warfare.

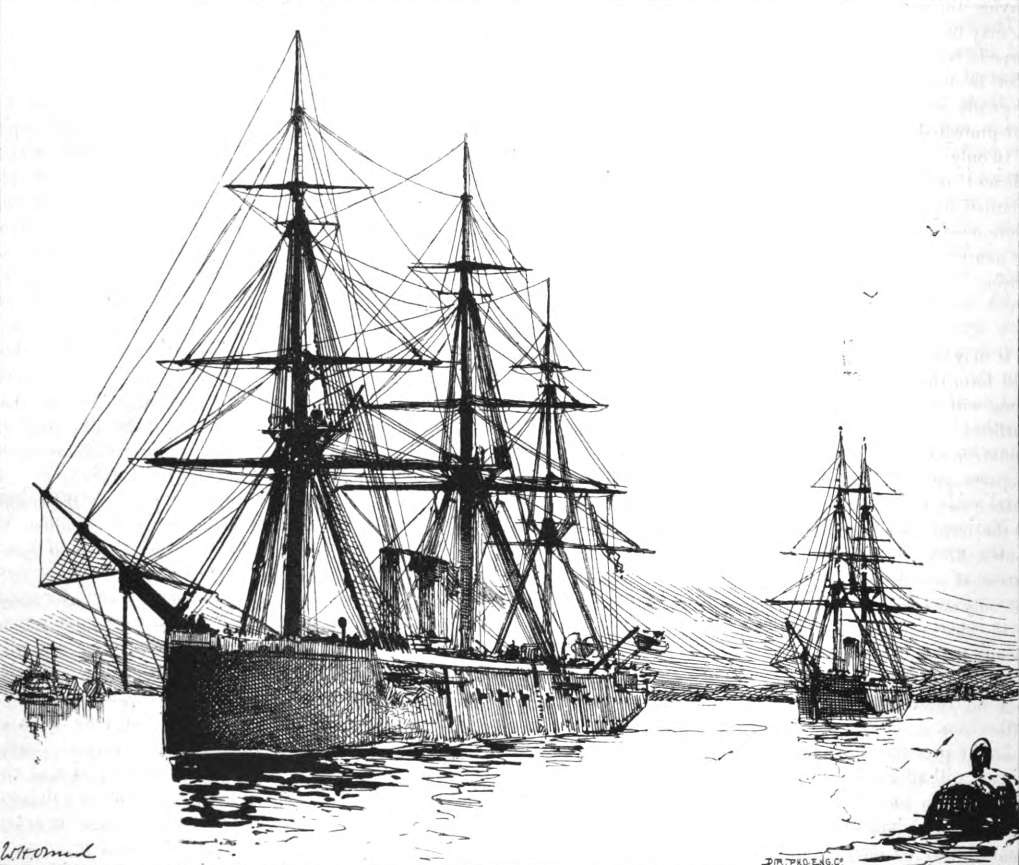
The Bacchante, speed 16 knots

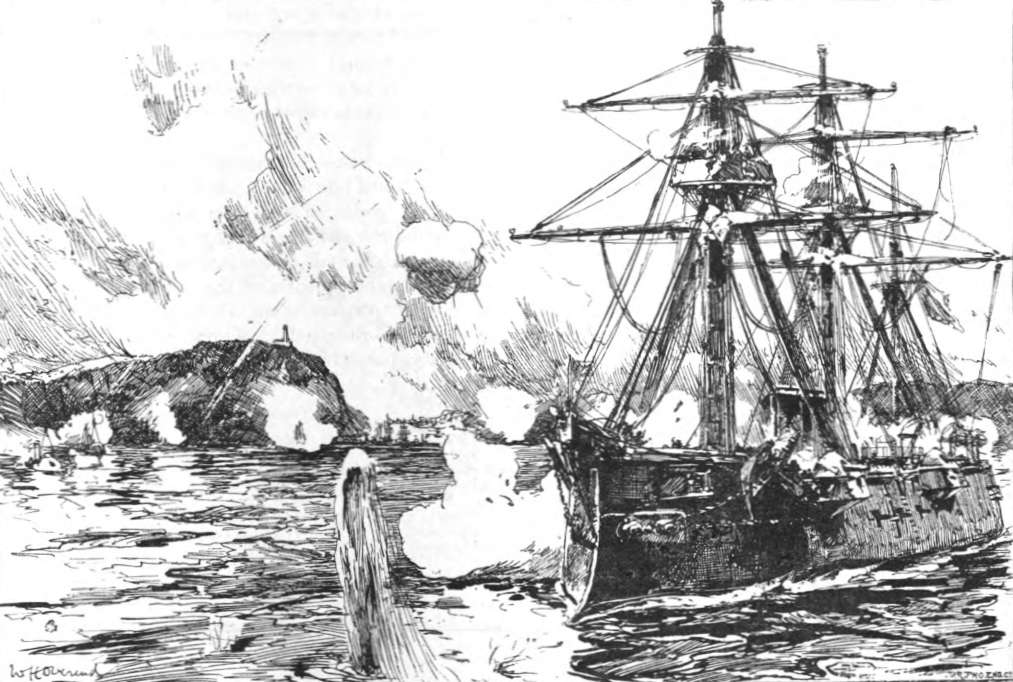
Iron clad line of battle ship attacking a harbour

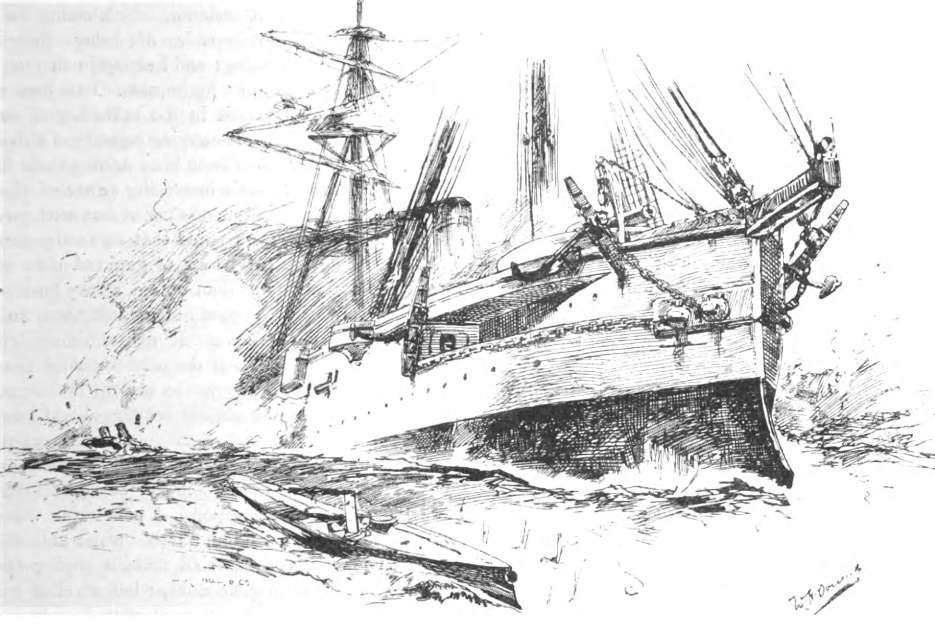
Ship of Temeraires type sinking by the stern after being torpedoed aft

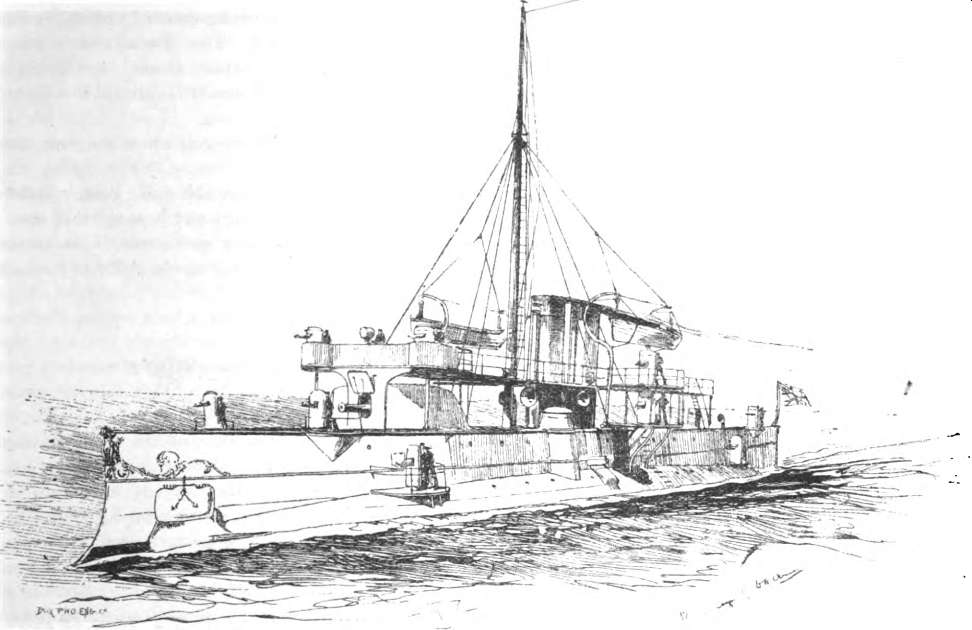
Type of protected torpedo boat

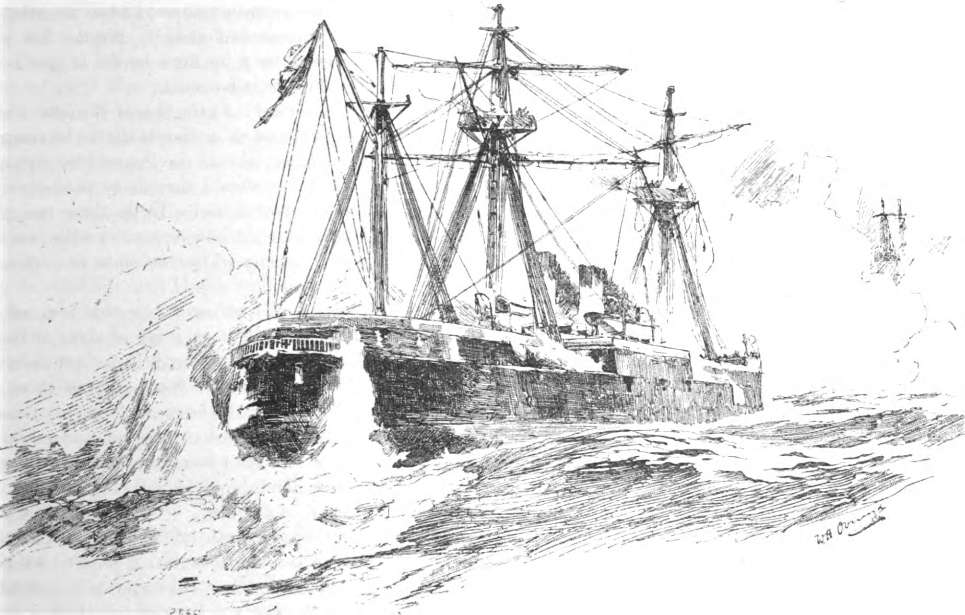
Ship of Alexandra type sinking by the head.jpg

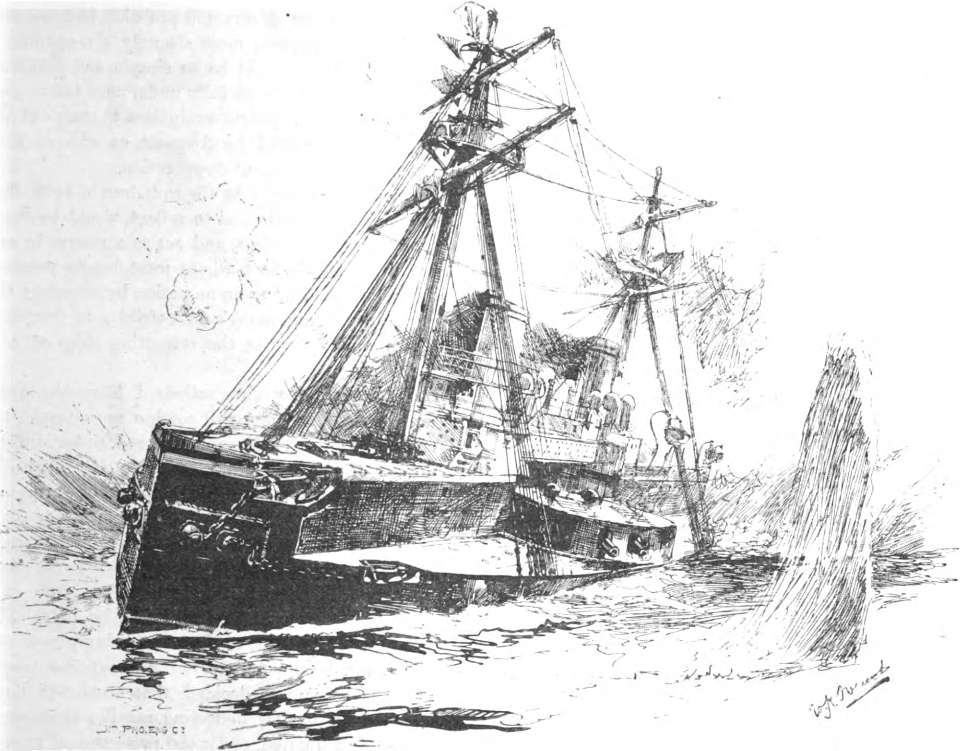
Ship of Inflexible type heeling over after damage to the armour below the waterline

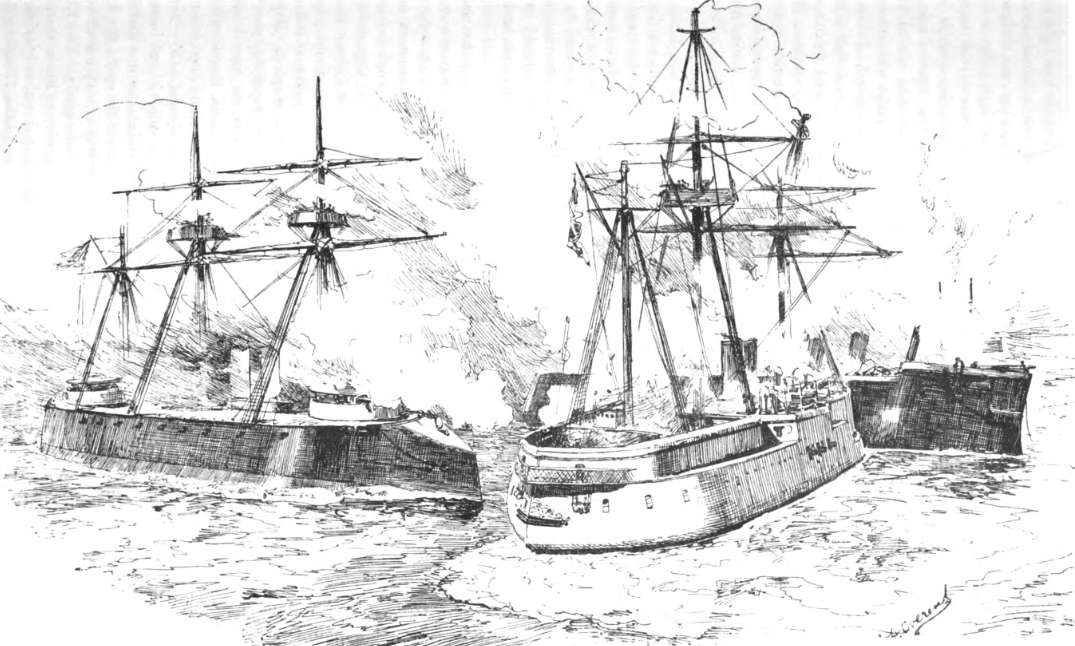
Ship caught by spur when end on ramming

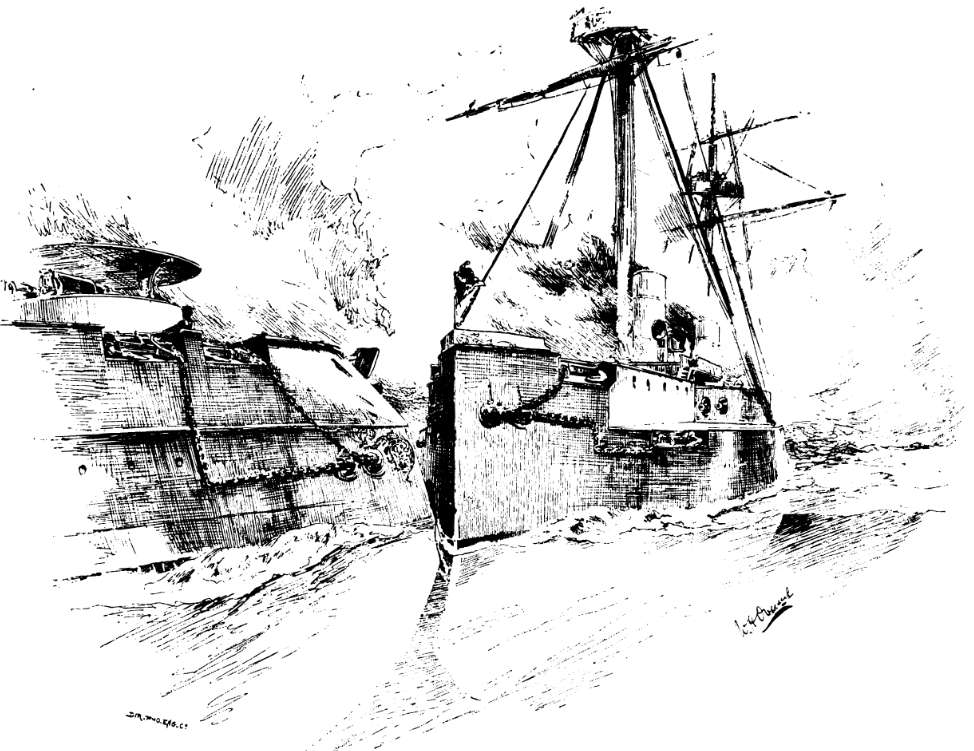
A short handy ship without a spur

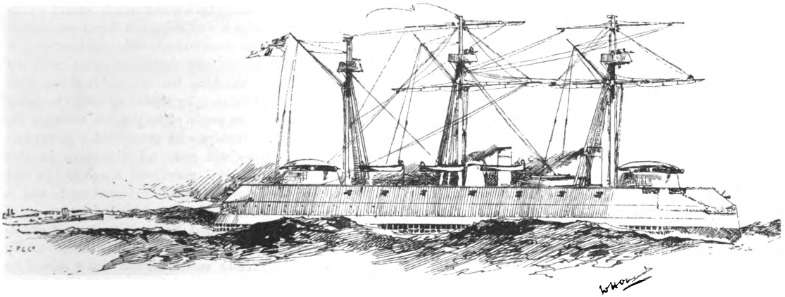
New type of ram with defensive netting against torpedoes

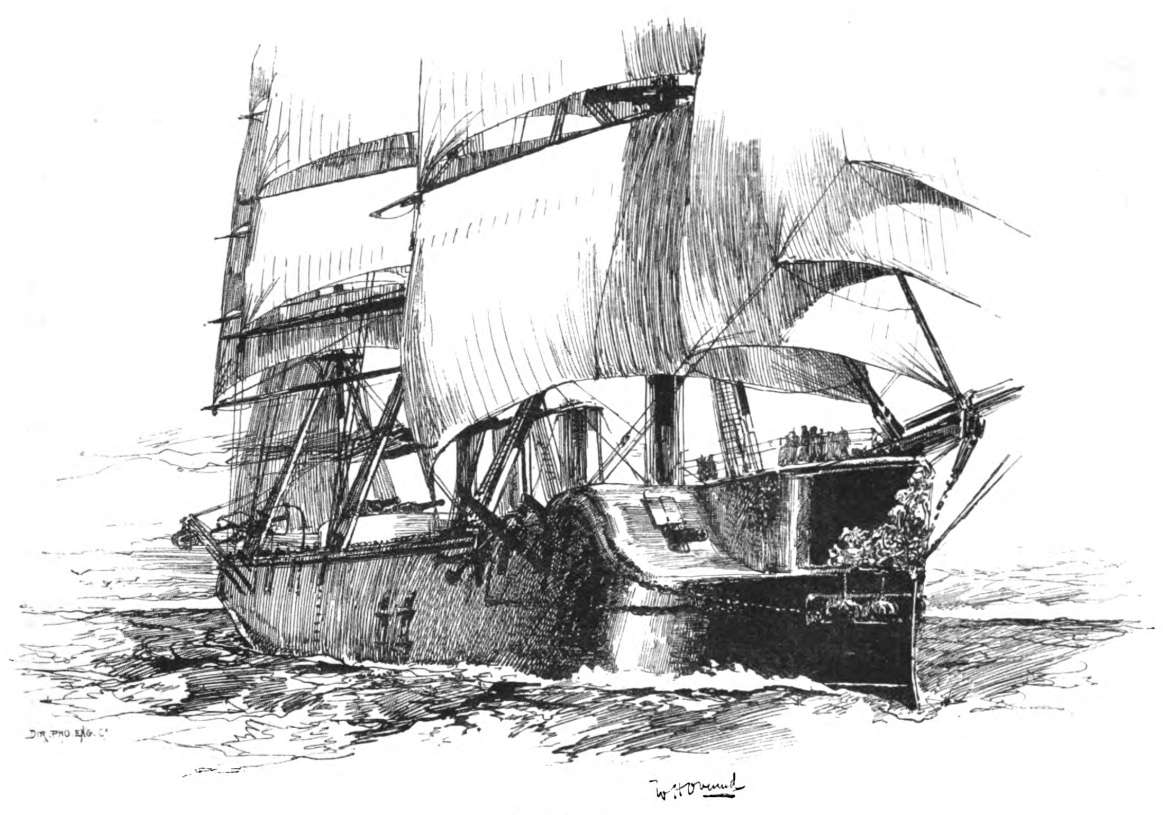
Swift Cruiser

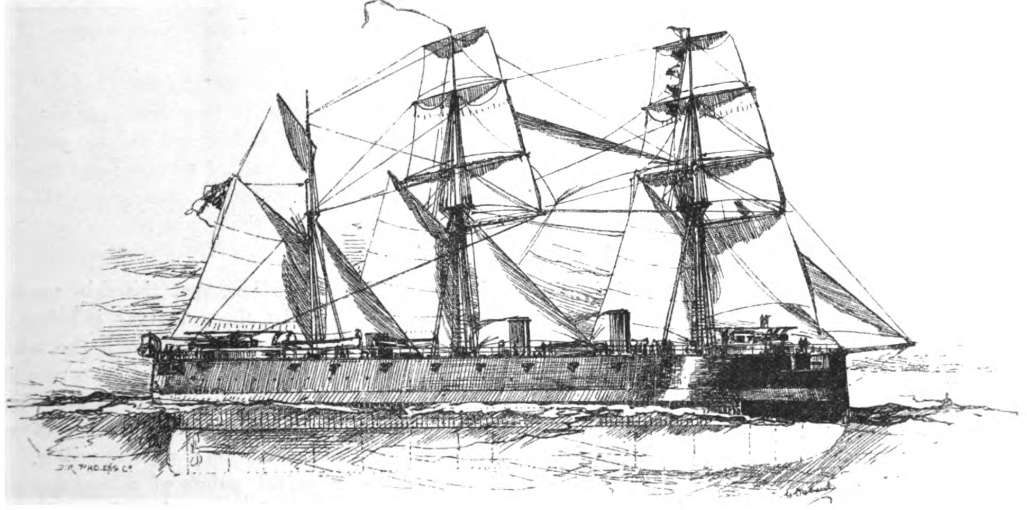
New-type of line of battle ship under steam and sail

=== An August Morning with Farragut ===
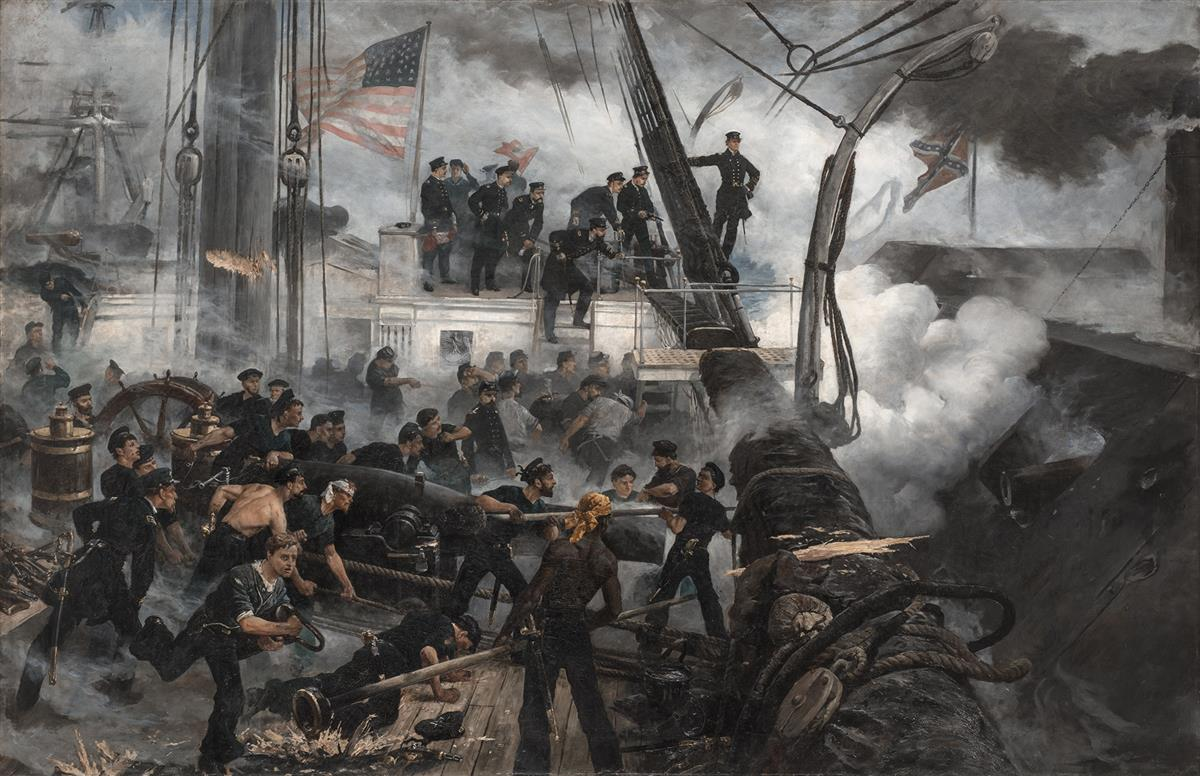
An August morning with Farragut; the Battle of Mobile Bay, 5 August 1864

An August morning with Farragut; the Battle of Mobile Bay, 5 August 1864 is Overend's greatest work. The painting is enormous, being 3.048m (10 feet) wide by 1.969m (6 feet 5½ inches) high. It was painted in oils on canvas. Overend was commissioned by the Fine Art Society, an art gallery with showrooms in London and Glasgow, to produce a painting of a naval battle of the American Civil War. Kirkpatrick states that Overend was commissioned to paint Admiral Porter's conquest of New Orleans, (Note: Admiral Porter and Admiral Farragut were adoptive brothers.) and that the Farragut painting was additional. Kirkpatrick further states that the Farragut painting was painted while Overend was in the United States. However, Mayhew, who was a colleague of Overend's, makes no reference to the New Orleans painting, but states that from the first the commission was for what became the Farragut painting, he also states that the work was painted in Overend's Ormond Street studio in London.

Overend attacked the commission with his usual thoroughness. He left Liverpool for New York, arriving on the RMS Scythia on 4 October 1882. Knowing virtually no-one in the United States, but supplied with letters of introduction from the US Minister in London to the navy department at Washington, he went vigorously to work to collect his material. He visited the ship to sketch it. He collected naval uniforms, plans, arms, sketches, photographs, and studies. He interviewed survivors and enlisted the aid of Farragut's son, a Naval Captain, in his researches. Overend painted the officers and men from photographs taken after their arrival in New Orleans.

Overend returned to London with all the reference material he had collected to paint the picture. While in the United States Overend visited the 1883 Columbian Exhibition in Chicago where he exhibited a painting, Victory!: the Prize Crew taking possession, and some drawings.

The title of the work, and even the work itself, were both drawn from a vivid account of the battle of Mobile harbour by J. C. Kinney which was published in the June 1881 edition of Scribner's Magazine under the title An August Morning with Farragut. The incident described in the painting can briefly be described as follows. On the morning of 4 August 1864 Admiral Farragut's fleet, consisting of 14 ships and four monitors forced their way past the forts protecting Mobile Bay. The Admiral was about his flagship, the Hartford, a wooden hulled combined steam-and-sail ship. On 5 August 1864, the steam-powered ironclad Confederate ram CSS Tennessee, the flagship of the small Confederate fleet of four ships, attempted to ram the Hartford. It struck the Hartford a glancing blow on the port bow and then the ships ground past each other, the moment captured in the painting. In the painting, the observer seems to be at the port taffrail amidships on the Hartford, looking backwards towards the wheel and quarter-deck. The Tenessessee is grinding along the port side of the Hartford moving deeper into the scene. Farragut is shown standing on the quarter-rail holding onto the rigging, where tradition holds that the lashed himself on in case he were hit.

Overend returned from America and painted the work in his painting in 1883 in his Ormonde Street Studio. The Pall Mall Gazette of 1 November 1883 announced that the Fine Art Society would shortly be selling prints of the painting. The painting was on display in the premises of James S Earle and Sons, in Philadelphia in September 1884. In 1885 G. A. R. Dorchester were selling prints of the painting for 25 cents each.

The painting was valued at $4,000 when it was displayed in at an art dealer's in Buffalo, New York in May 1885. It was also displayed in other towns throughout the US including Cedar Rapids, Iowa, and finally in Hartford, Connecticutin January 1886. Hartford was the town for which Farragut's flagship was named.

By February the local newspaper, the Hartford Courant, had already begun a campaign to purchase the picture for Hartford, (Note: The justification for the purchase was that: The flagship was named for Hartford.; The Hartford Poet Harry Howard Brownell was featured in the painting; P. C. Kinney who had written the account of the battle was from Hartford and was featured in the painting.) with the intent to donate the painting the free picture gallery in the Wadsworth Atheneum. (Note: It is still on display in the Wadsworth.) The newspaper estimated the painting was worth $10,000 but could be obtained for about one third of this price. Three subscribers had already contributed $100 each to the fund. The subscription was successful as the painting was hung in the Wadsworth Athenaeum in c. May 1886.

=== Book illustration ===
Kirkpatrick lists over 100 books illustrated by Overend for over four dozen authors. The authors he illustrated for included:

- E. M. Alford (1841–1905), an English poet and writer of historical fiction
- Sir Reginald Bacon (1863–1947), a Royal Navy Admiral who wrote mostly about naval issues
- F. C. Beames (1863–1944), an English author of books for young children
- M. Bramston (1841–1912), an author of 40 or so religious-themed novels
- Robert Williams Buchanan (1841–1901), a Scottish poet, dramatist, and novelist
- Marion Clifford Butler (1841–1919), an English baroness who wrote fiction for girls
- Mrs. Henry Clarke (1853–1908), who wrote historical fiction and children's books
- Harry Collingwood (1843–1922), a writer of boys' adventure fiction, usually in a nautical setting
- F. Norreys Connell (1874–1948), an Irish dramatist, novelist, and man of letters
- Charles H. Eden (1839–1900), a public servant and writer on travel and of over a dozen novels
- A. Eubule Evans (1839–1896), an Anglican cleric and popular novelist, including tract novels for the SPCK
- George Manville Fenn (1831–1909), a prolific author of fiction for young adults
- Sir Samuel Ferguson (1810–1886), an Irish poet, whose interest in Irish mythology and early Irish history was a forerunner of the Irish Literary Revival
- H. O. Arnold-Forster (1855–1909), a British politician and writer who served as Secretary of State for War (1903–1905)
- Thomas Frost (1821–1908), an English radical journalist and writer
- Charles Alan Fyffe (1845–1892), an English historian and journalist
- Evelyn Everett-Green (1856–1932), a prolific English novelist who wrote about 350 book, beginning first with pious stories, then historical fiction for girls, and eventually moved to adult romantic fiction
- Bret Harte (1836–1902), an American short-story writer and poet
- Nellie Hellis (1853–1930), Helena Jane Hellis, a writer of books for children with a Christian message, and a popular lecturer on Dickens
- G. A. Henty (1832–1902), a prolific writer of boy's adventure fiction, often set in a historical context, who had himself served in the military and been a war correspondent
- Edward N. Hoare (1842–1909), a clergyman with the same name as his father, who wrote improving books and books on historical topics
- John C. Hutcheson (1840–1897), a British writer about life at sea
- Henry Kingsley (1830–1876), an English novelist, editor, and war correspondent, a brother to Charles Kingsley
- Laura M. Lane (1846–1929), Lauretta Caroline Maria Luffman, an English writer and women's activist who mainly wrote stories for girls, moved to Australia and became a journalist
- C. E. M.
- Catherine Mary MacSorley (1848–1929), an Irish writer of religious books and stories for girls
- Frederick Marryat (1792–1848), a Royal Navy officer who wrote adventure books for children
- Herman Melville (1819–1891), an American novelist, short-story writer, and poet who wrote Moby Dick
- Frank Frankfort Moore (1855–1931), an Irish journalist, playwright, novelist, poet, and biographer
- Mary Onley (1835–1908), an English schoolmistress and author of children's books
- Ella Edersheim Overton (1864–1947), who contributed to religious-themed magazines and published two novels
- Edgar T. Pickering, a writer of boys' adventure books and a prolific writer of stories for boys' magazines
- Charles Napier Robinson (1849–1938), a Royal Naval officer who on retirement, became a journalist on naval matters and published the journal Navy and army illustrated : a magazine descriptive and illustrative of everyday life in the defensive service of the British Empire
- William Clark Russell (1844–1911), an English writer, best known for his novels in nautical settings
- Samuel Whitchurch Sadler (1821–1886), a retired paymaster-in-chief of the Royal Navy wrote juvenile fiction, mostly on nautical topics
- Walter Scott (1771–1832), the Scottish historical novelist, poet, and historian who wrote Ivanhoe
- Mary Shipley (1843–1914), wrote children's fiction with a moral, mostly for the SPCK
- Helen Shipton (1857–1945), wrote children's fiction with a moral, almost exclusively for the SPCK, as well as some plays in later life
- Sydney Mary Sitwell (1840–1908), a novelist who also wrote a standard text on the growth of English colonies
- Catherine E. Smith, wrote children's fiction with a moral, mostly for the SPCK
- George Smith (1831–1895), a philanthropist who campaigned against industrial child labour and for the decent treatment of Gypsies
- Robert Southey (1774–1843), an English poet and writer, one of the Lake Poets
- Gordon Stables (1840–1910), a Scottish medical doctor in the Royal Navy who wrote boys' adventure fiction
- Herbert S. Sweetland (1859–1905), a writer and artist who wrote fairy tales, novels and short stories
- Benjamin Waugh (1839–1908), a social reformer who founded the UK's National Society for the Prevention of Cruelty to Children
- Edward Whymper (1840–1911), an English explorer, mountaineer, illustrator, and author; brother to Frederick Whymper
- Frederick Whymper (1838–1901), an English artist and explorer; brother to Edward Whymper
- Beech Wood, who wrote children's fiction with a moral, mostly for the SPCK
- G. Robert Wynne (1838–1912), an Irish cleric, who wrote on the Anglican church as well as a few moral stories for children

==== Example of book illustration for juvenile fiction ====
The following illustrations were drawn for A Chapter of Adventures (1890) by G. A. Henty. These were wood-cuts, and Newbolt suggests that Overend did his own engraving for the woodcuts he did for Blackie.

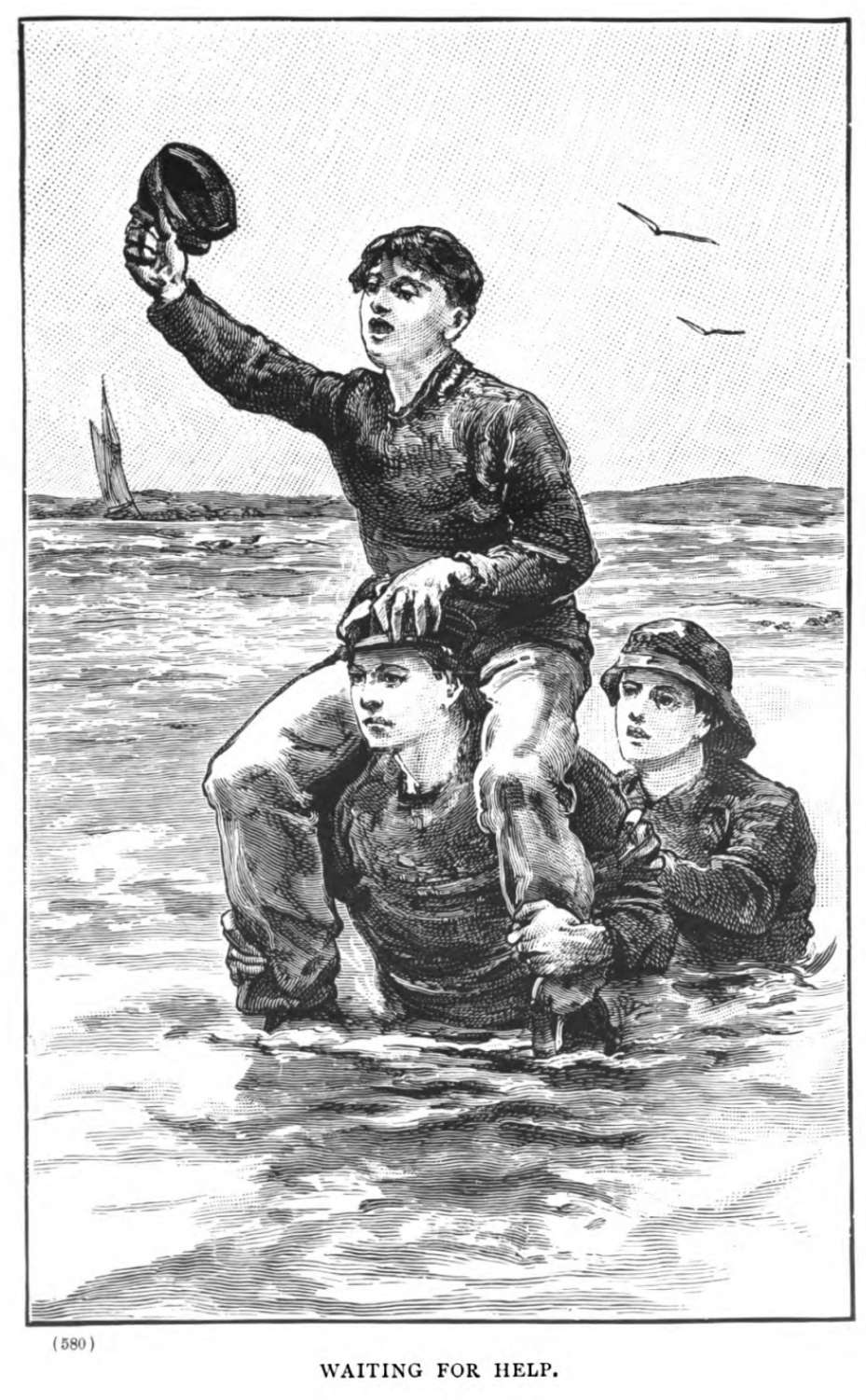
The boy waves his cap to call attention to their plight before they are swept under by the tide

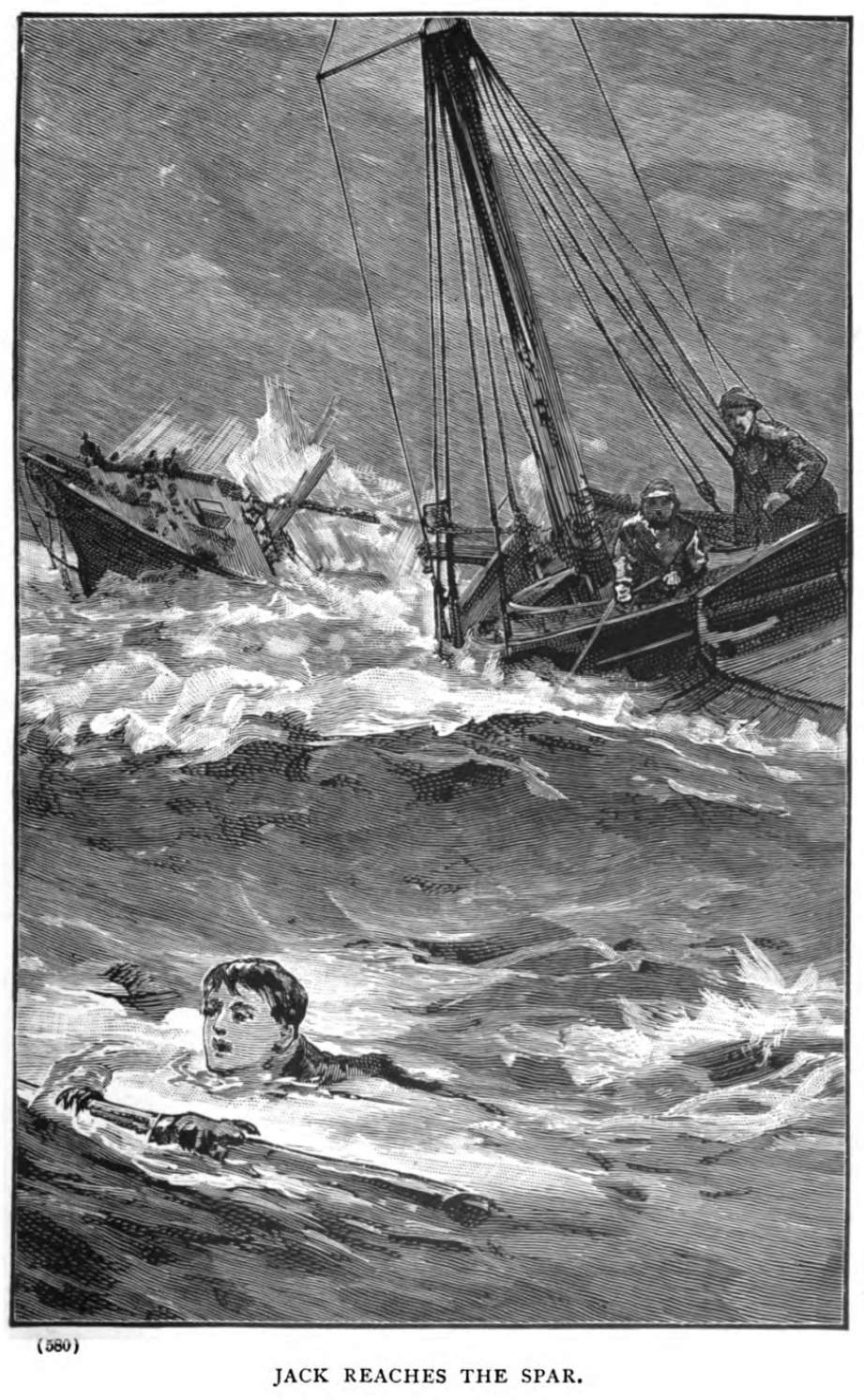
Jack swims towards the spar to pass a rope to the foundering ship

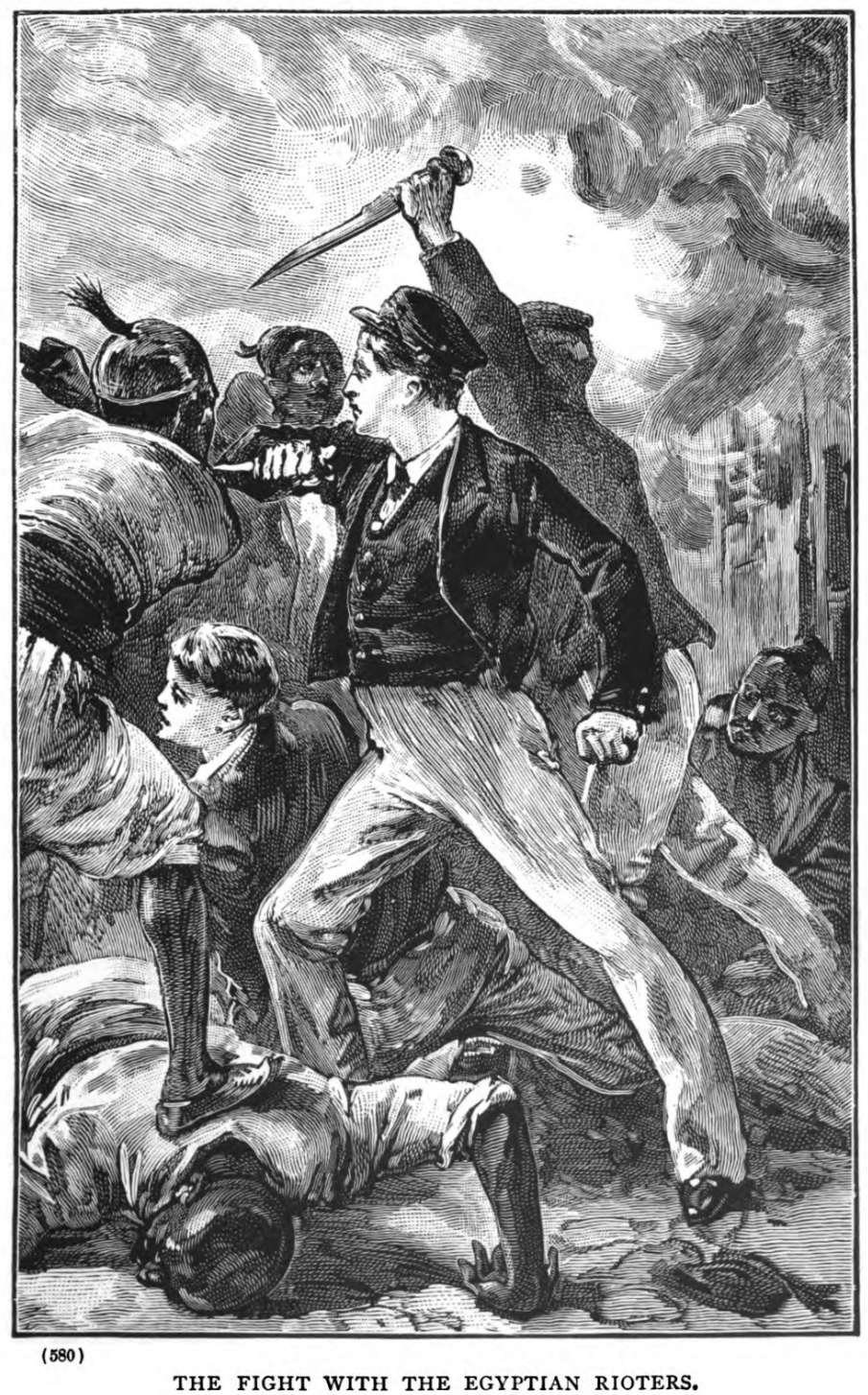
The boys are attacked by rioters in the poorer quarter

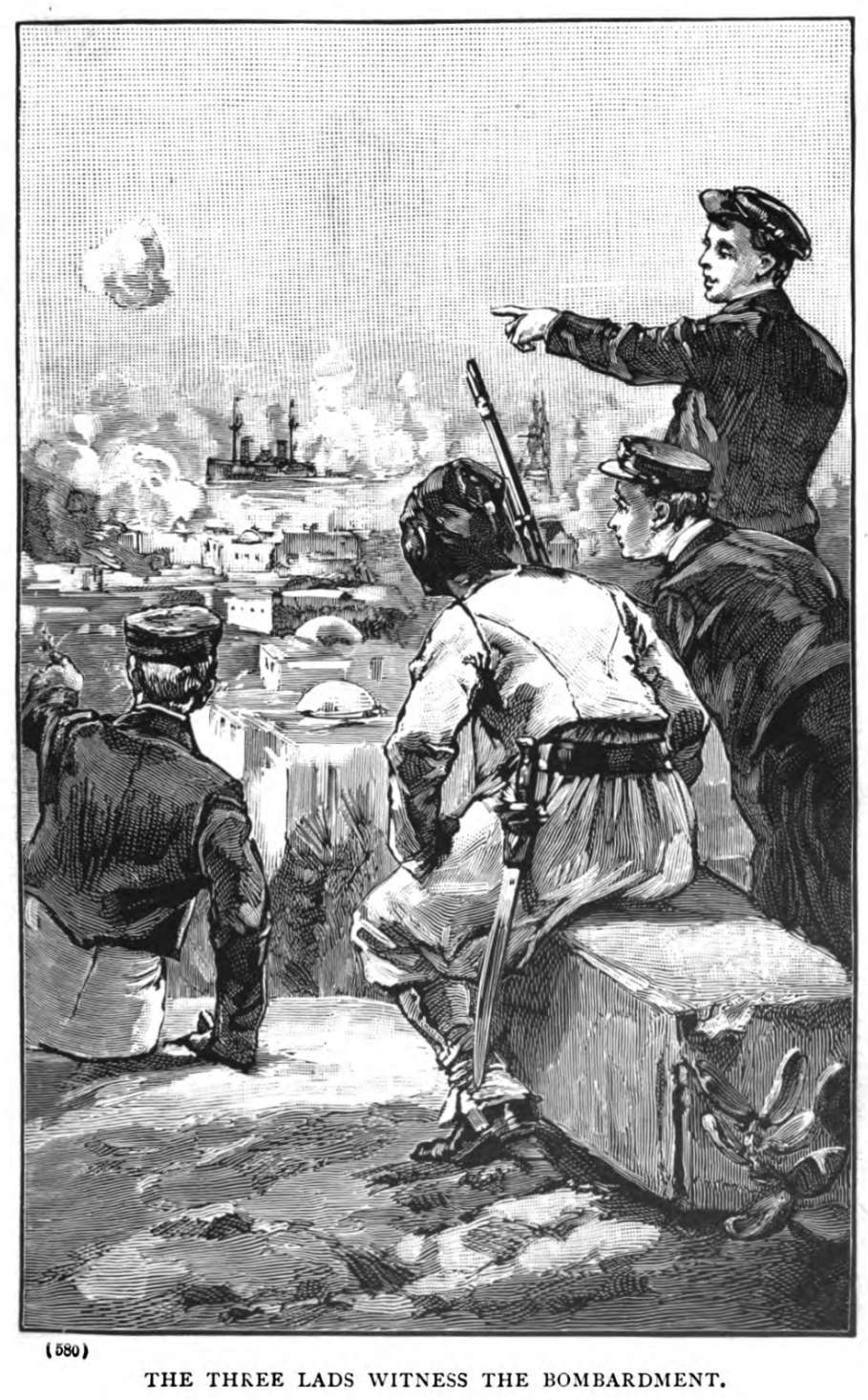
The boys watch the bombardment of Alexandria together with their guard

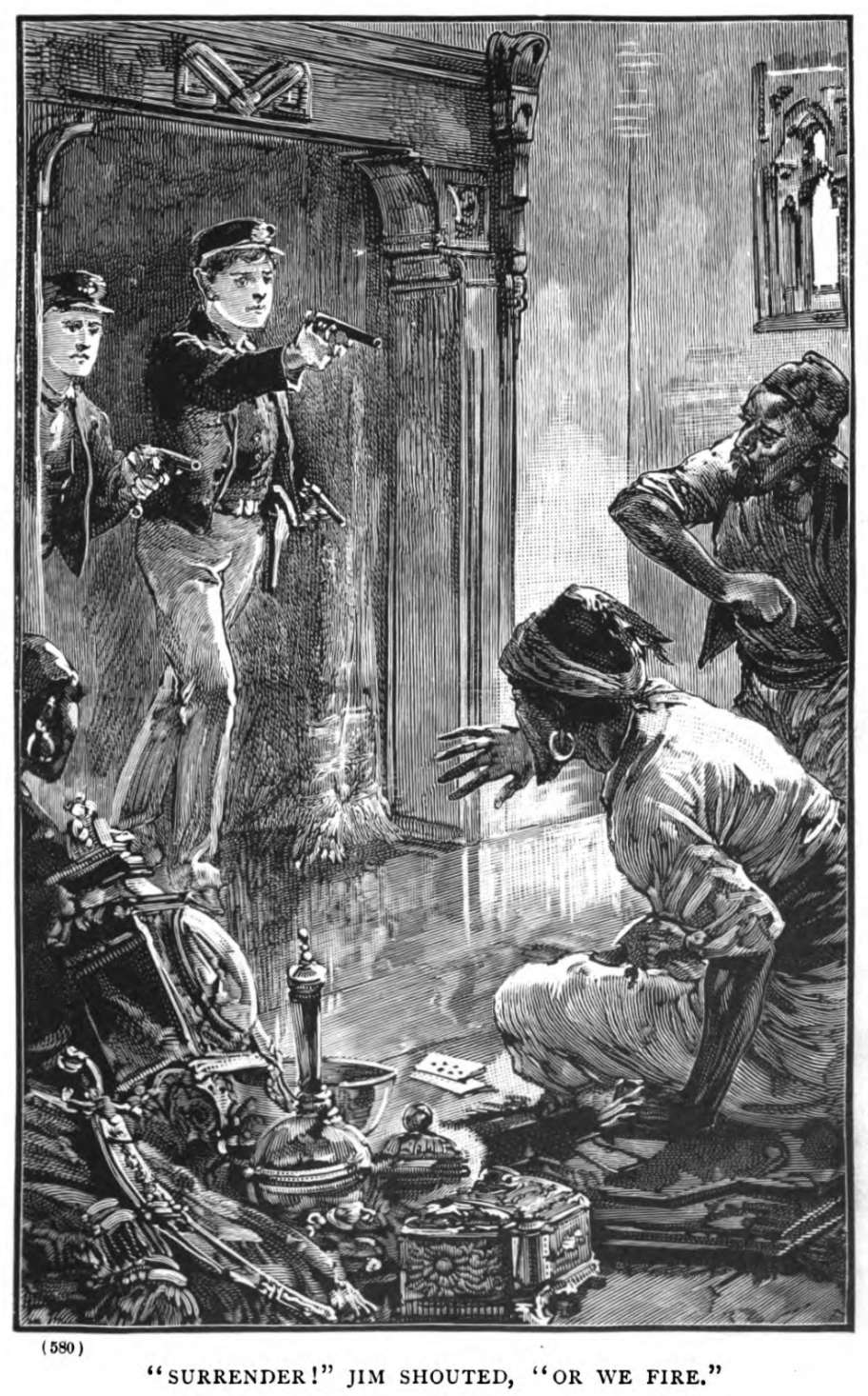
The boys hold up the looters who are piling up the fruits of their robberies

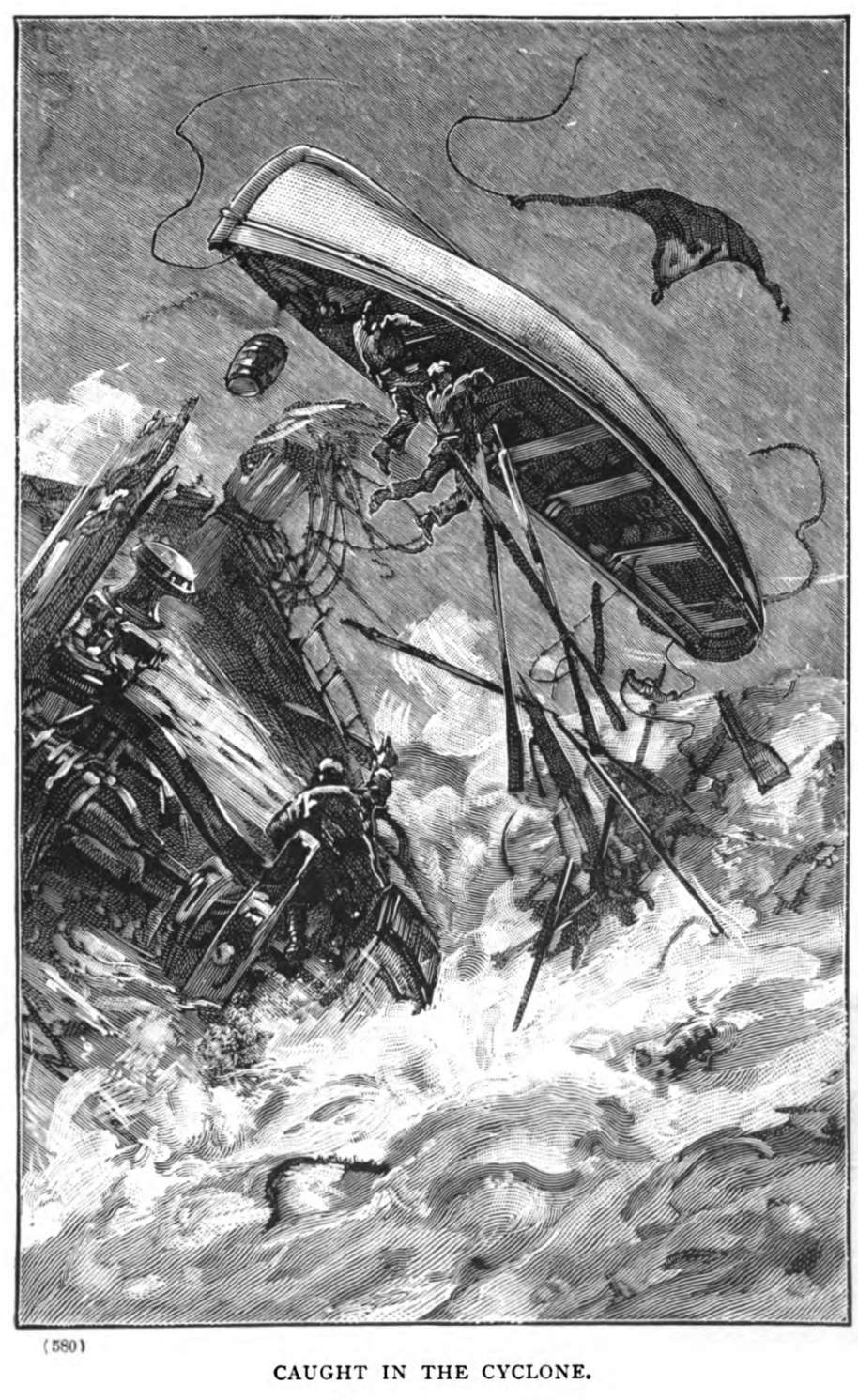
The boat is thrown up by the cyclone

==== Example of book illustration for adult fiction ====
Overend illustrated not only juvenile fiction, but also books for adults, such as George Smith's campaigning book about the treatment of Gypsies (Note: Gypsy life: Being an Account of Our Gipsies and Their Children (1880). London: Haughton and Co. 344 pages. Illustrated by W. H. Overend and others.) or William Clark Russell's novel A Strange Elopement (1892) in which a young man carries off, in mid-ocean, a young woman from the custody of the most truculent and vigilant of fathers. This had first appeared as a serial in The English Illustrated Magazine, starting with the October 1891 edition.

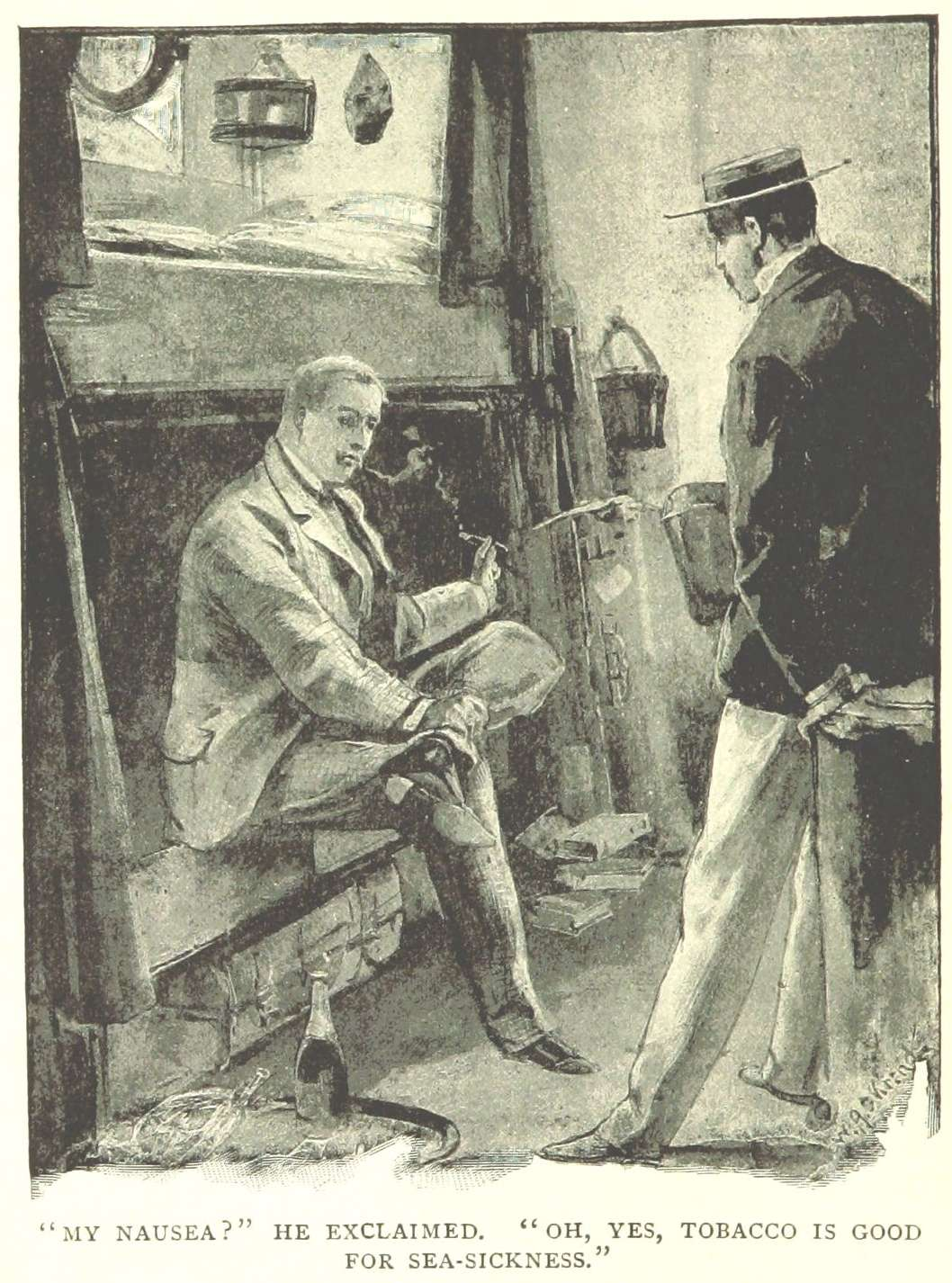
Discussing tobacco

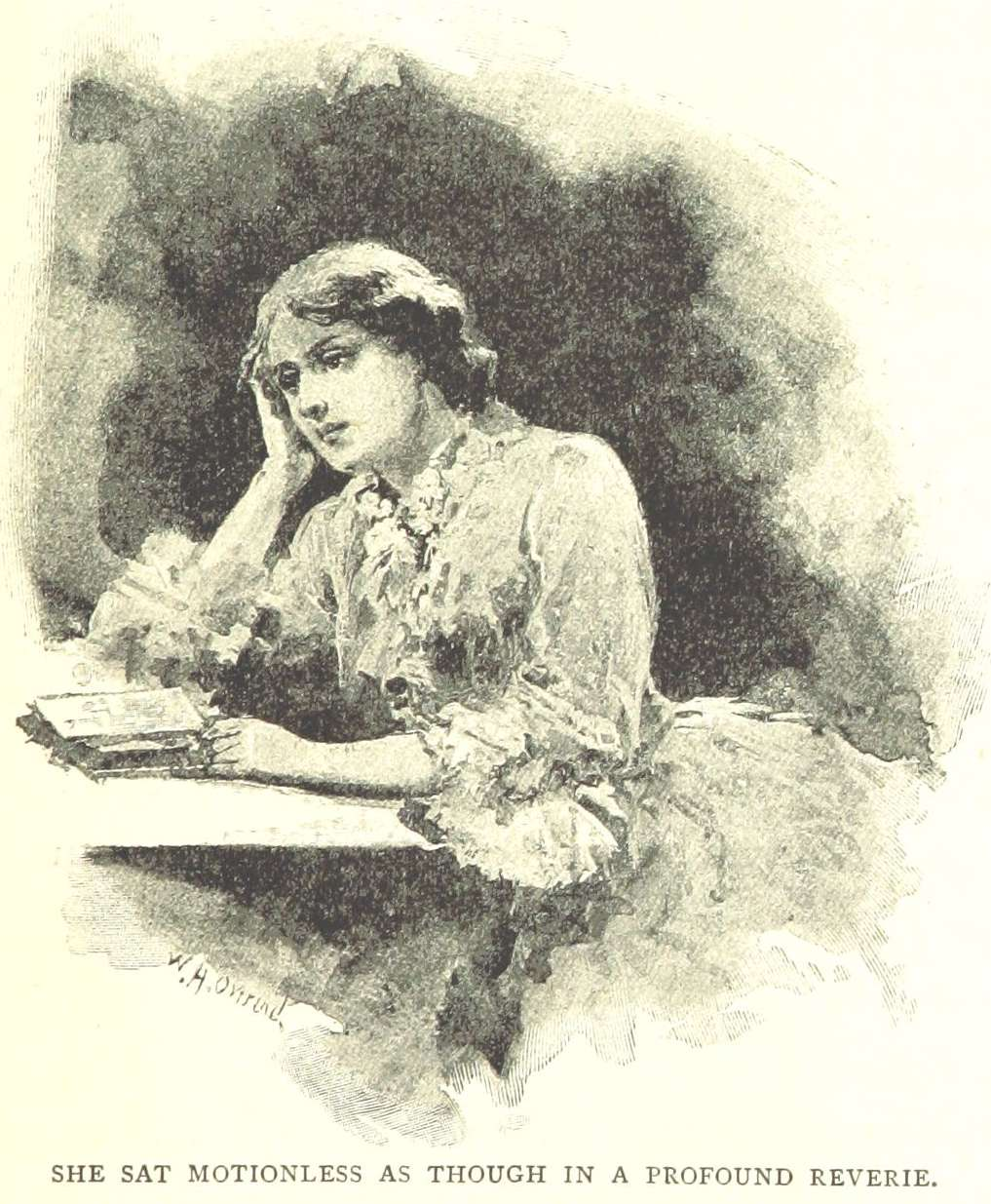
A profound reverie

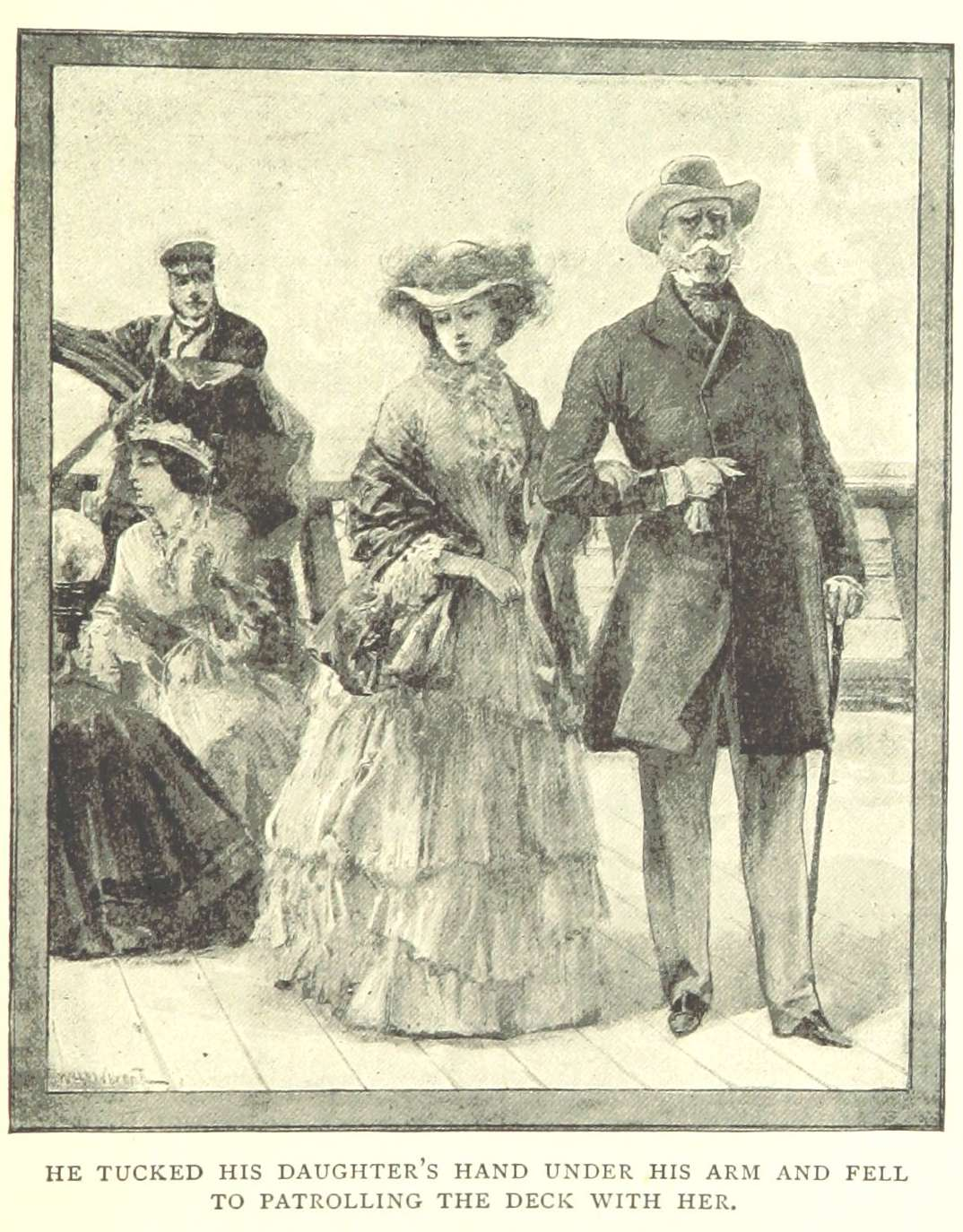
Promenading on deck

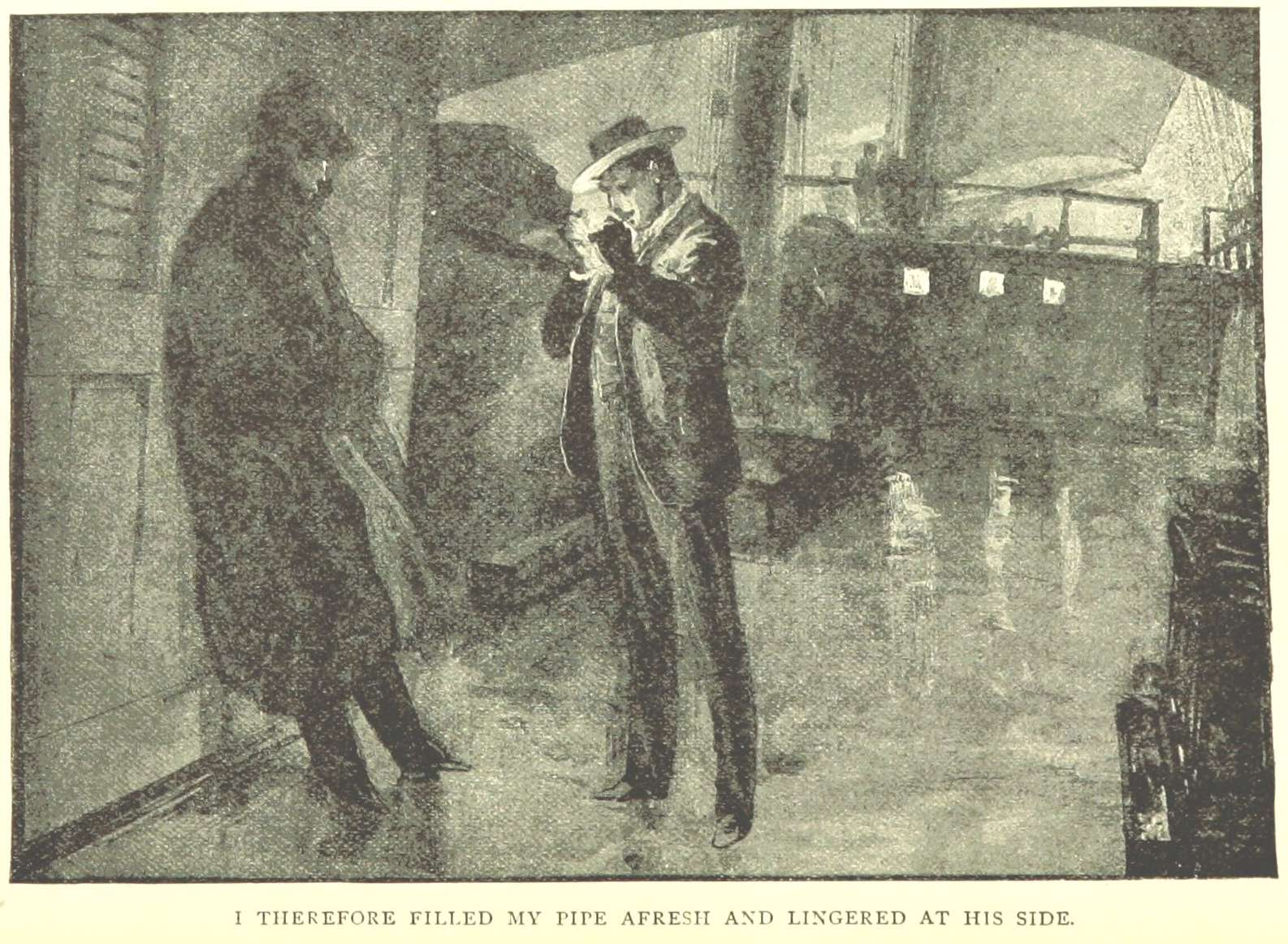
Smoking on a dark night

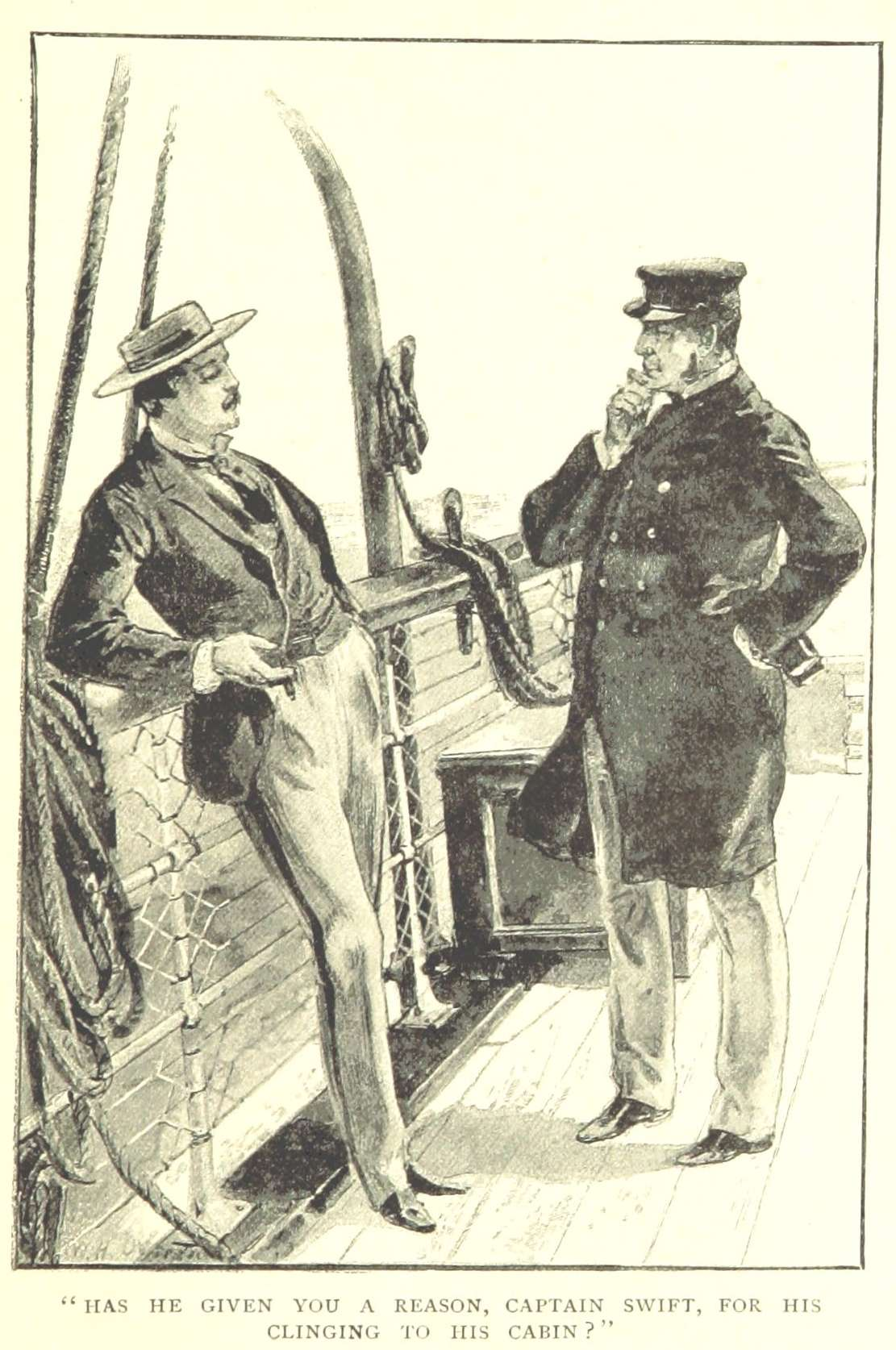
Talking to the Captain

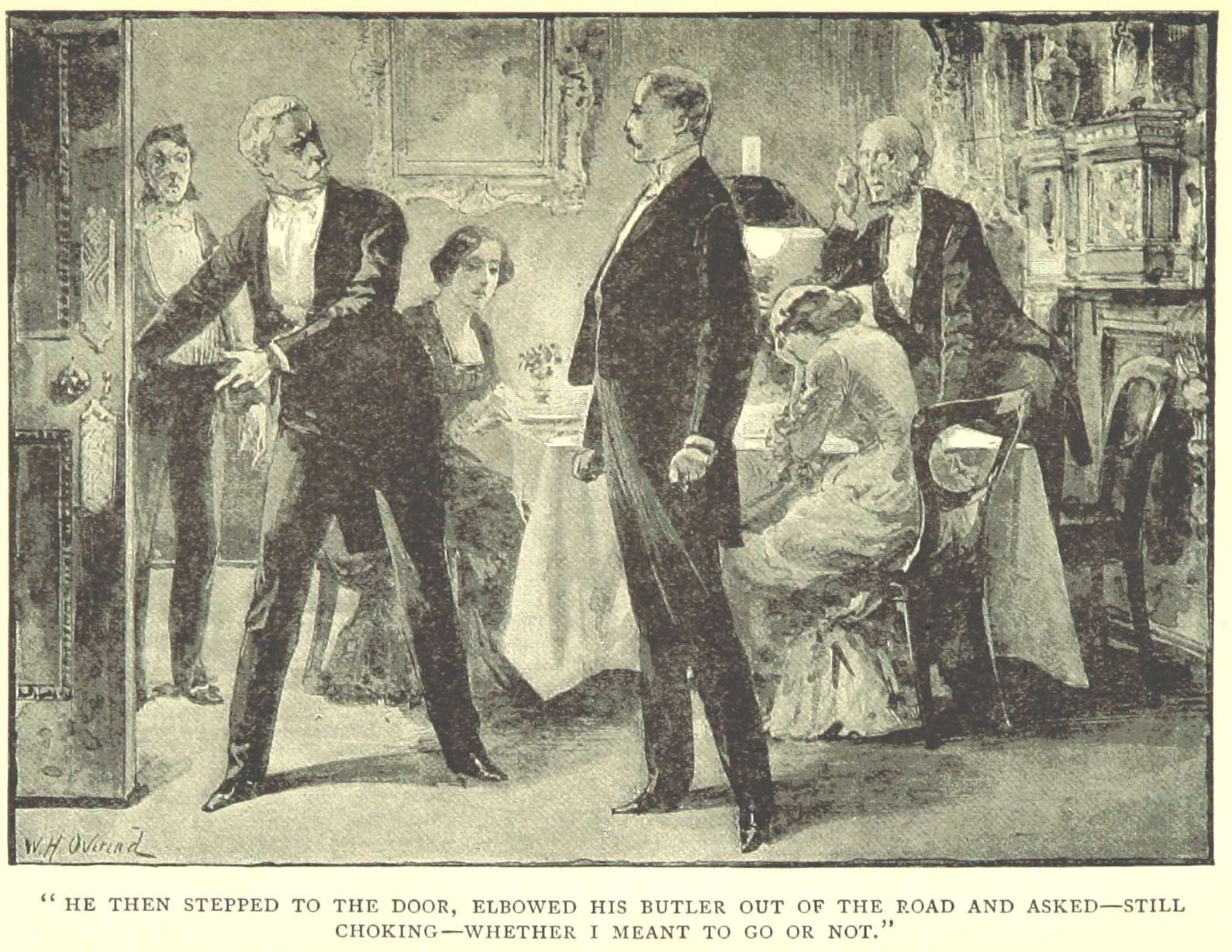
An unwelcome visitor

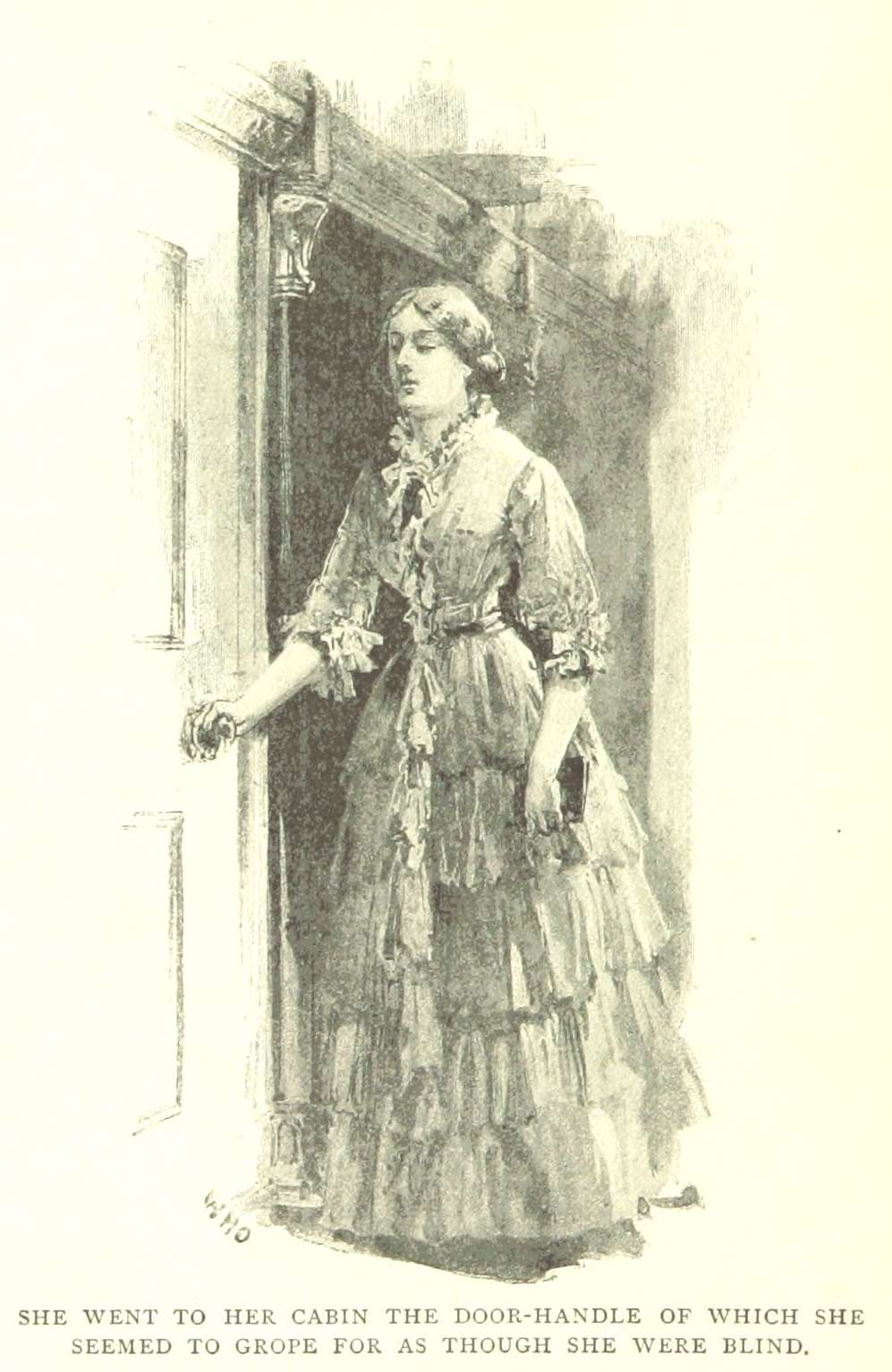
At the cabin door

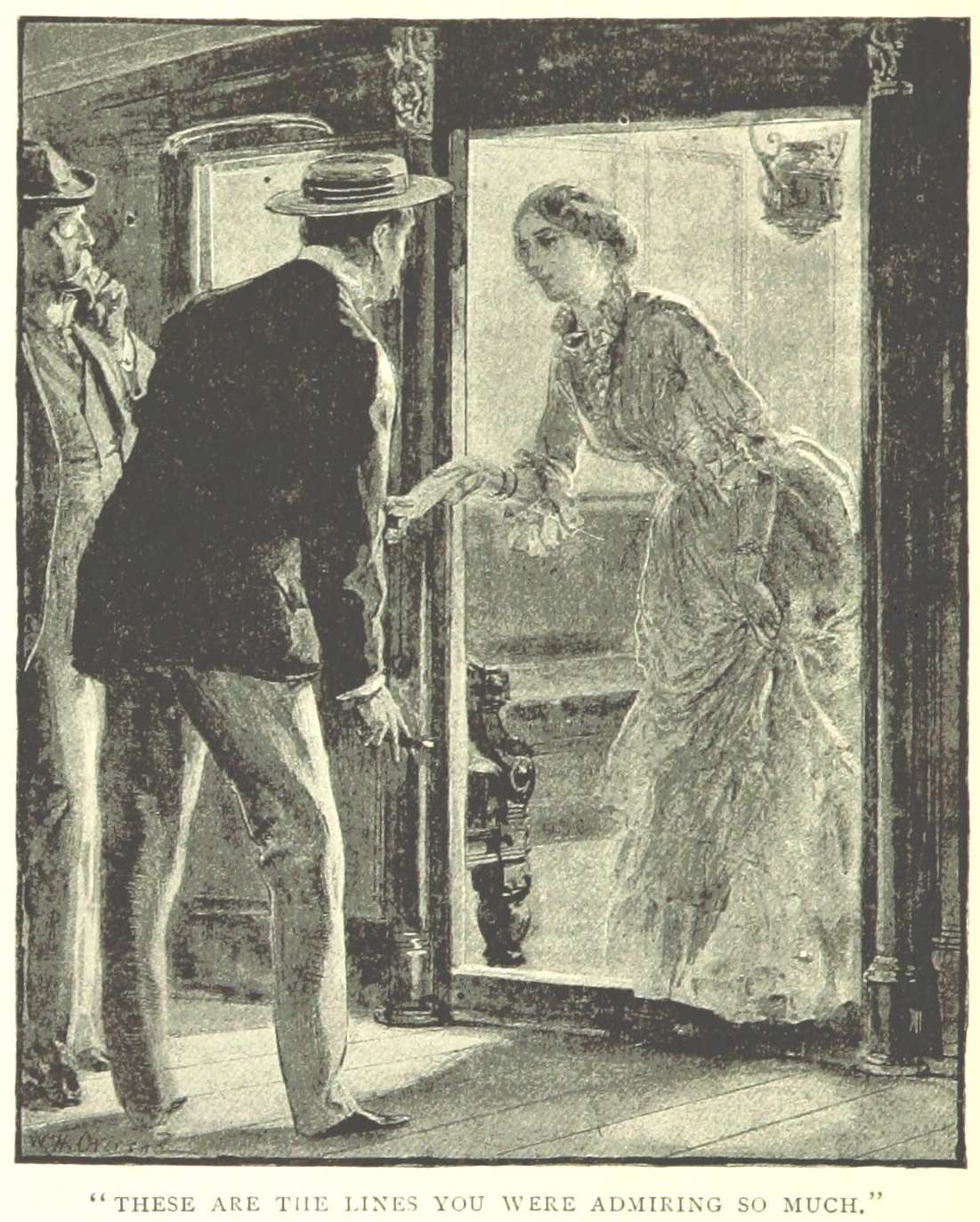
Handing over a document

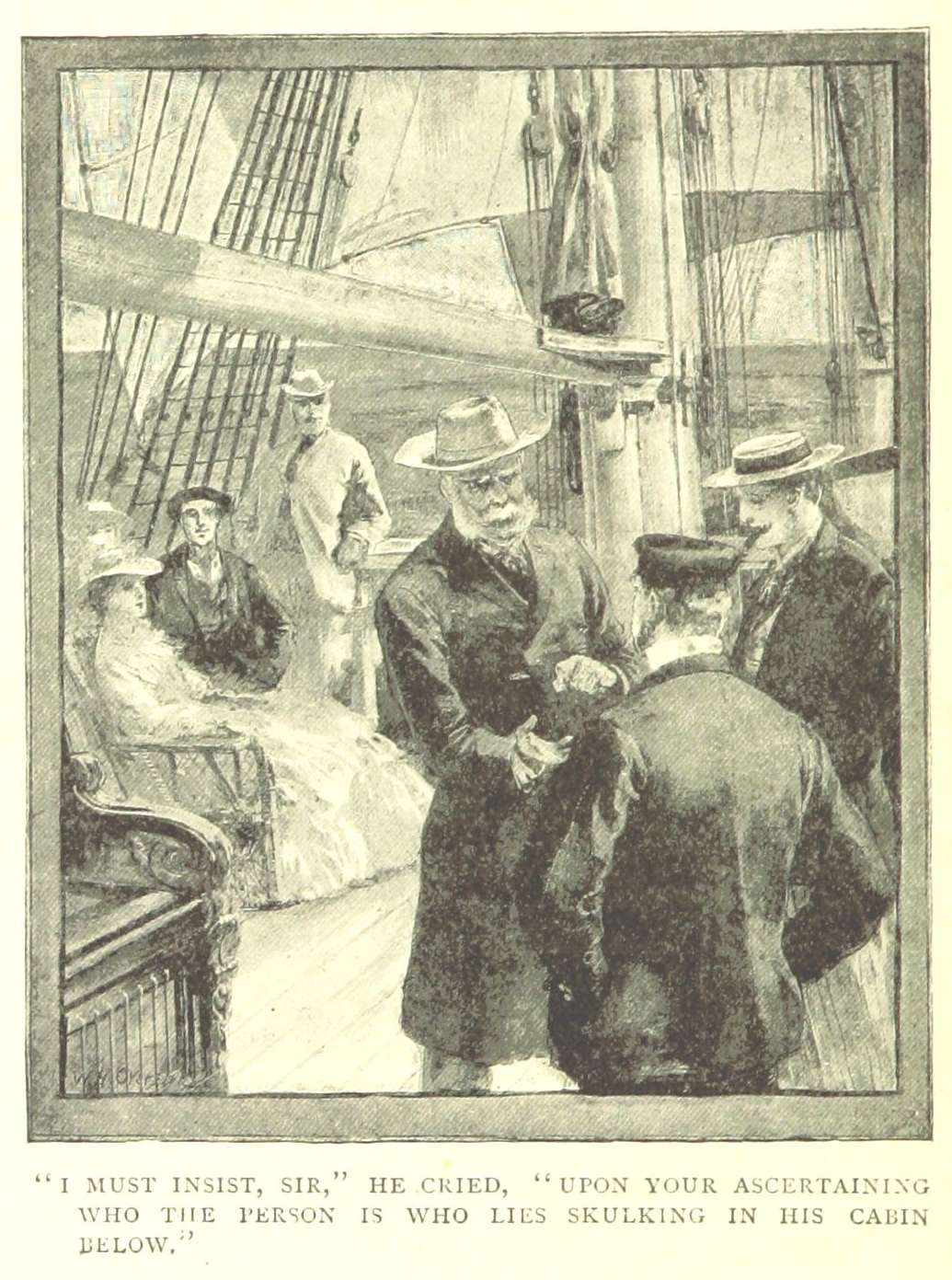
Irate passenger

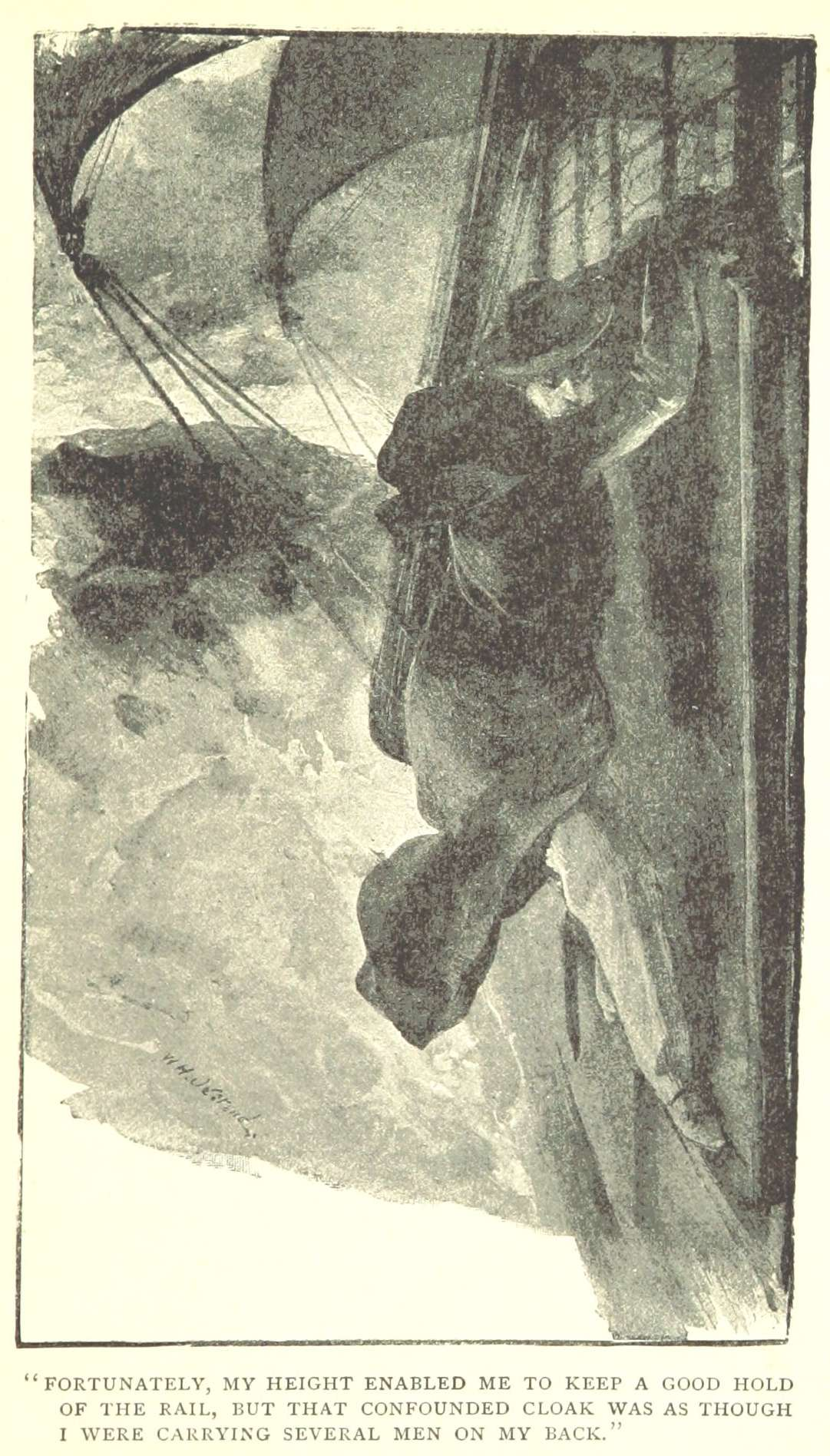
Climbing outside the hull

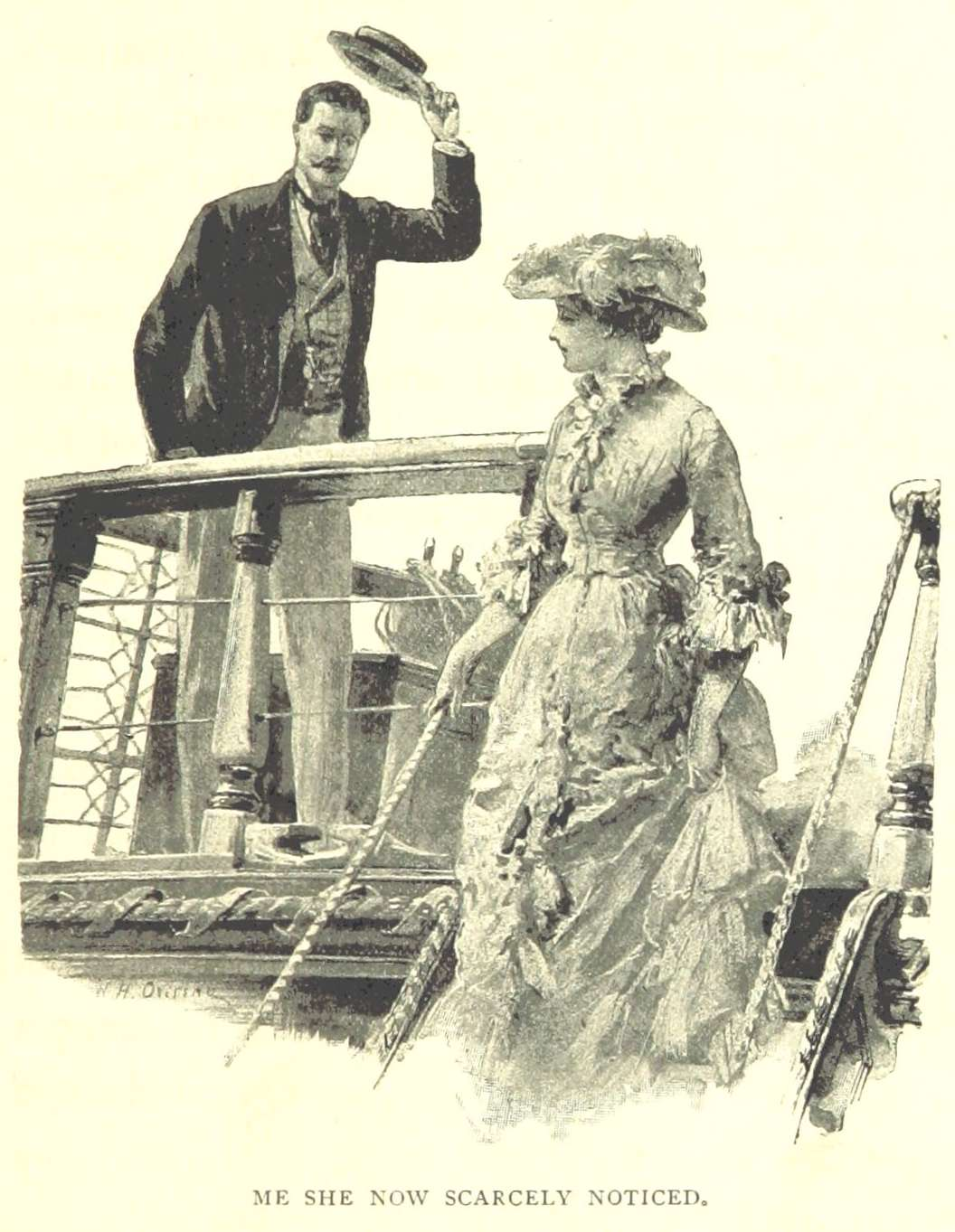
Snubbed!

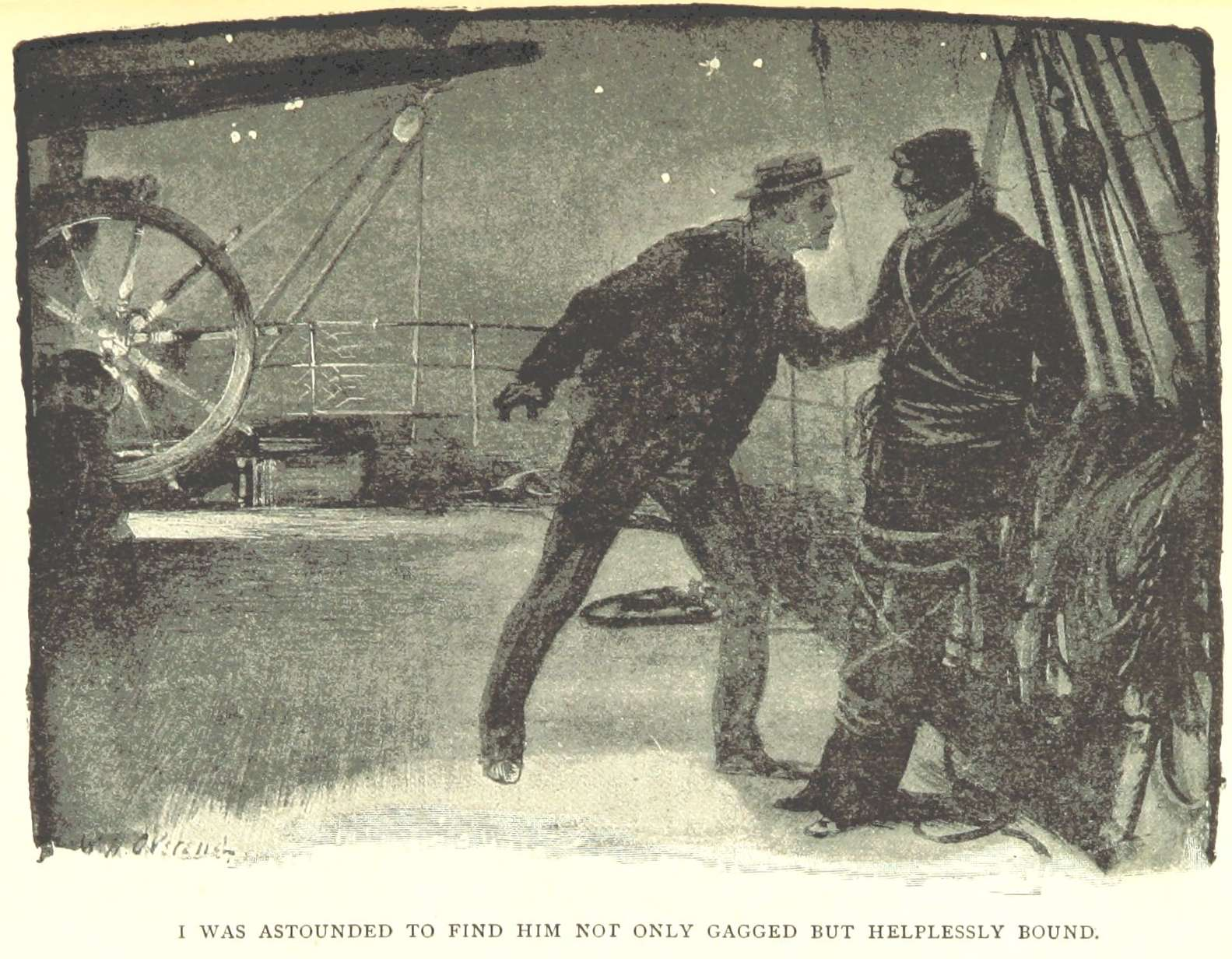
Found gagged and bound!

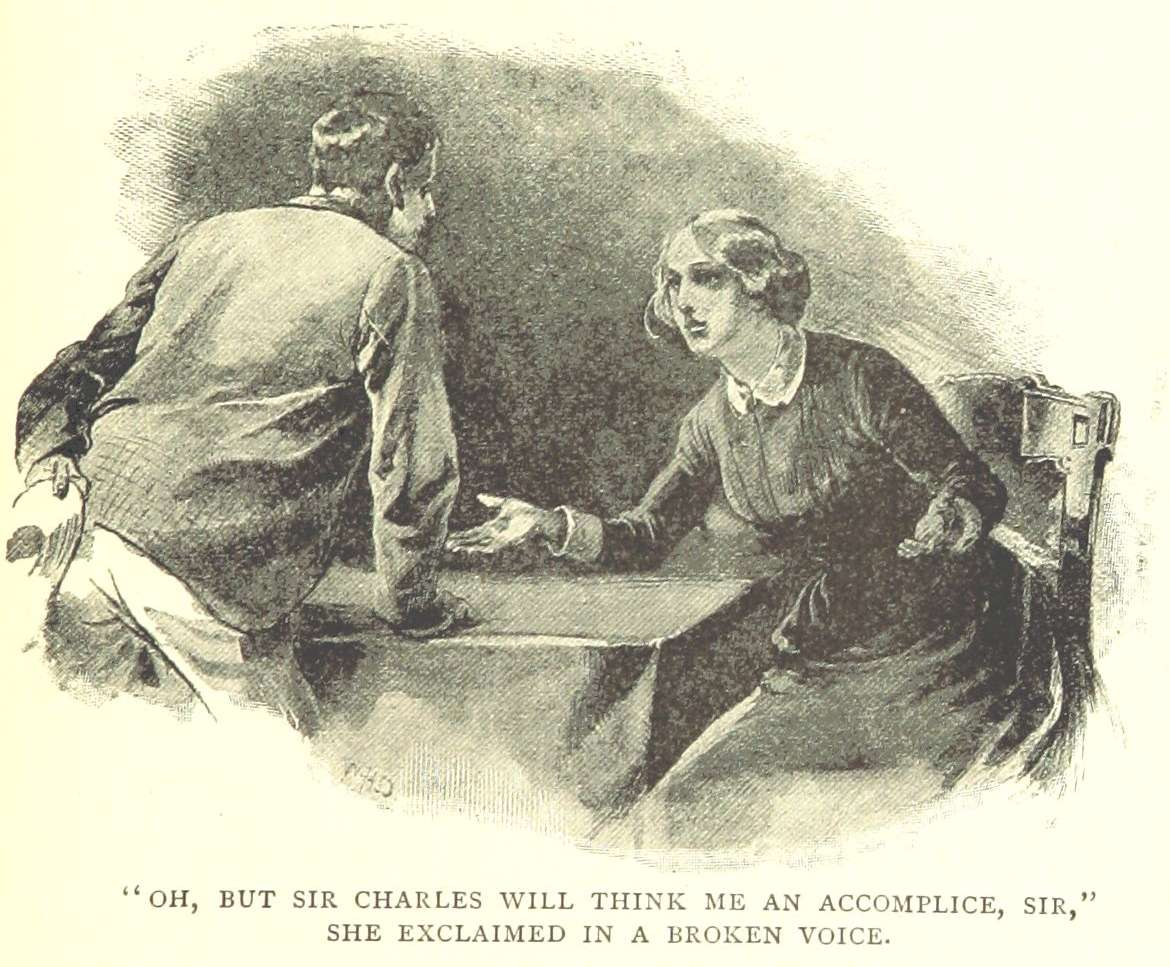
Discussing with a female servant

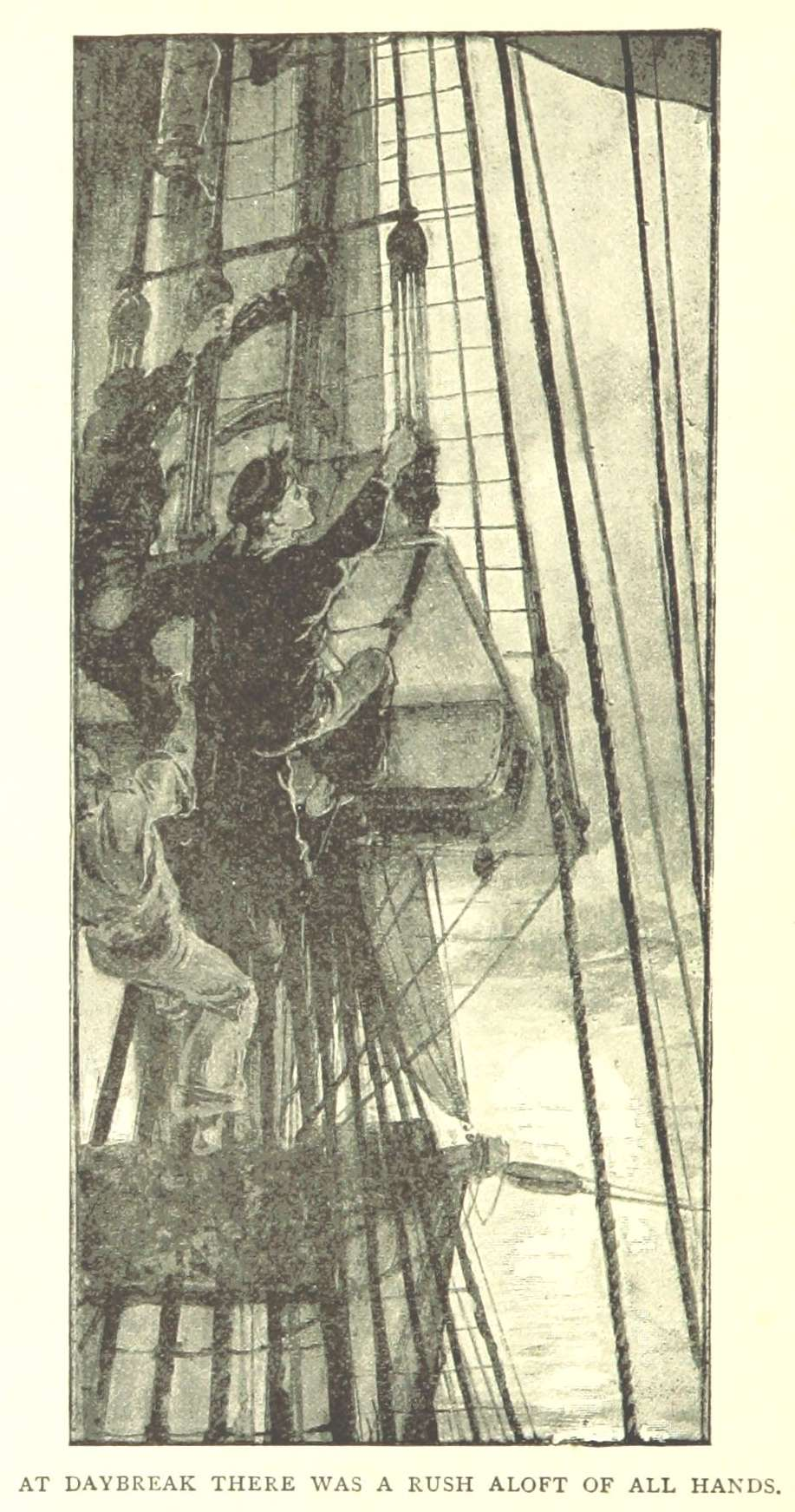
Hands going aloft

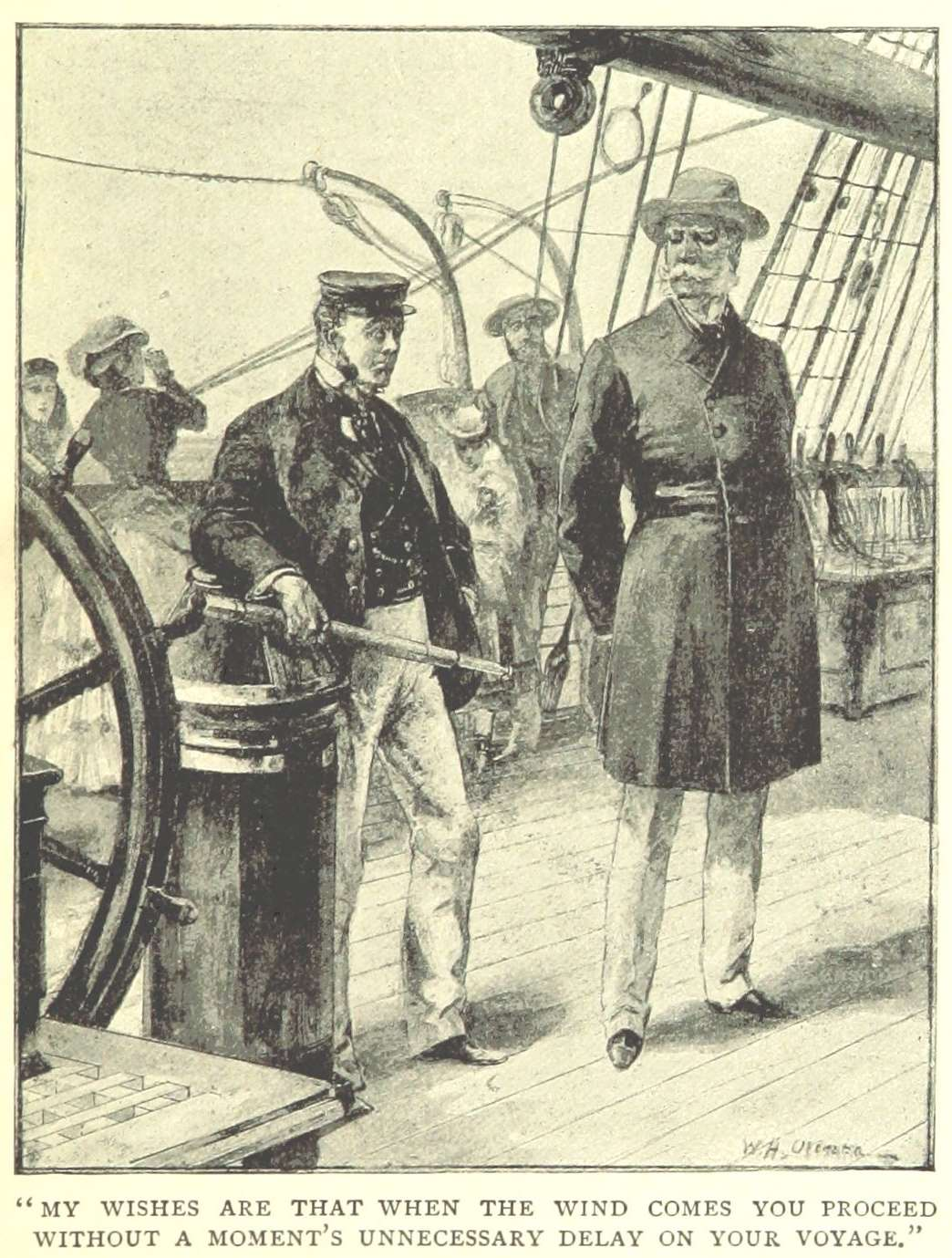
Instructing the Ship's Captain

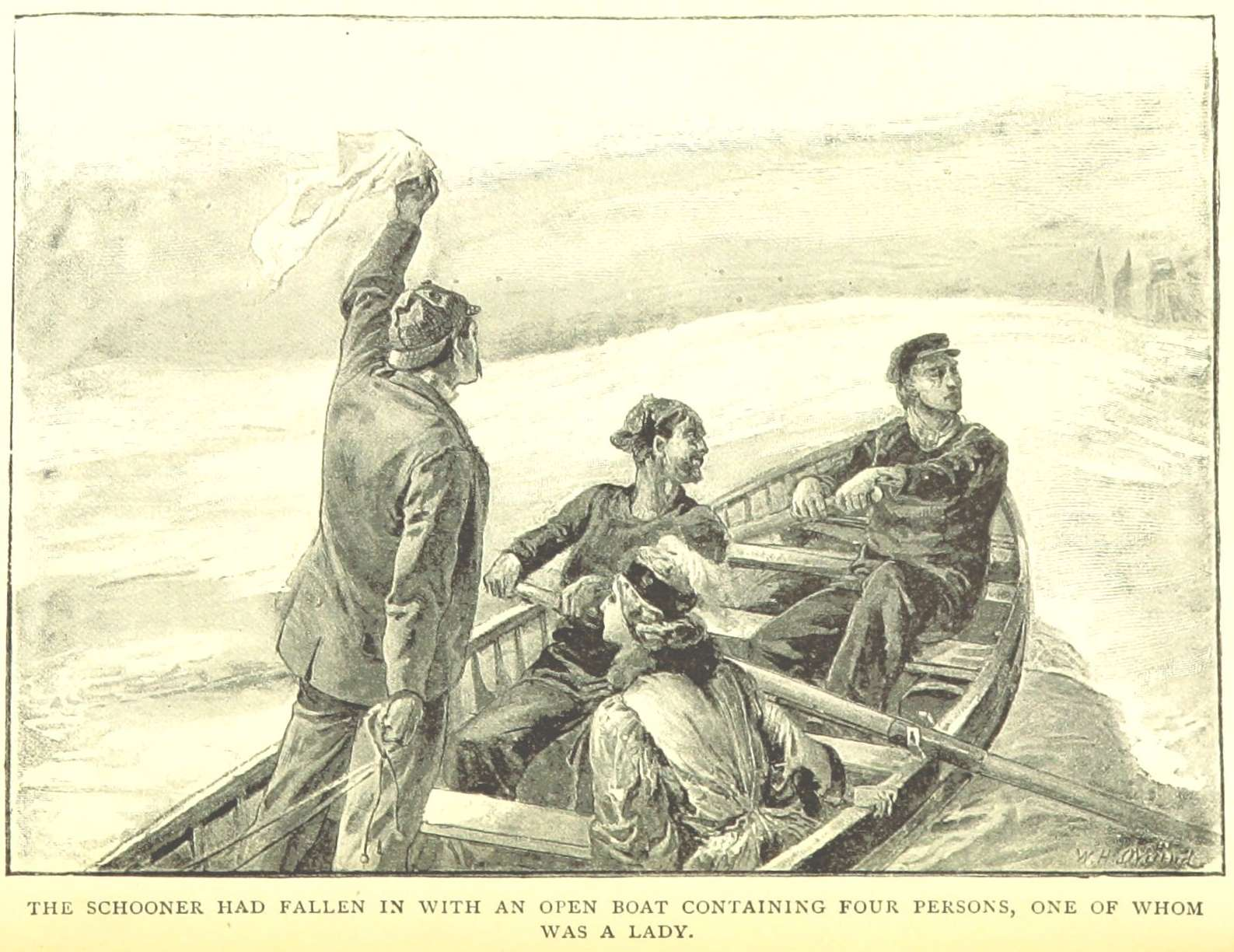
In an open boat

== Death ==
Overend died at his residence, 17 Southampton Street (now named Conway Street), Fitzroy Square, in London, on the evening of Friday, 18 March 1898. The death certificate gave a number of causes of death including Locomotor ataxia which is often a symptom of tertiary syphilis. Other causes included Catarrh of the Bowels (diarrhoea), and Albuminuria, an indicator of kidney disease. His doctor stated that he had been suffering for ten years. The columnist on the Penny Illustrated Paper noted that Overend had never been strong since he injured his leg, and that he had complained of Catarrh of the Bowels the last time he had dropped a drawing off at the Illustrated London News. He was buried on Wednesday, 23 March 1898 in Tottenham Cemetery. His estate was valued at over £3,000, a very respectable sum for the period.

== Assessment ==
Despite his early death "he did a prodigious amount of work in his comparatively short life". An obituary in the Army and Navy Gazette noted that "he was recognized as the foremost exponent of naval art, the only man who could at once satisfy his brother artists, the student of naval history, and the professional seaman . . . His knowledge of the detail of the old ships was unequalled, and his accuracy in matters naval, both archaeological and of the present day, was proverbial. Modest, unassuming, and amiable, no man was more cordially liked by his professional brethren, while the high appreciation in which he was held by those who cherish naval art and literature was shown by his election to the council of the Navy Records Society."

The headmaster of Charterhouse, twenty years after Overend left the school, wrote to him to request material for the Greyfriars magazine, produced by former pupils, and referred to him as "the most distinguished draughtsman the school had ever turned out." The Arts Club said of him: "A painter and black-and-white artist of great ability; held in affection by every member of the club." This was not a graveside eulogy, but a description of him more than 20 years after his death.
