= George Smith (philanthropist) =

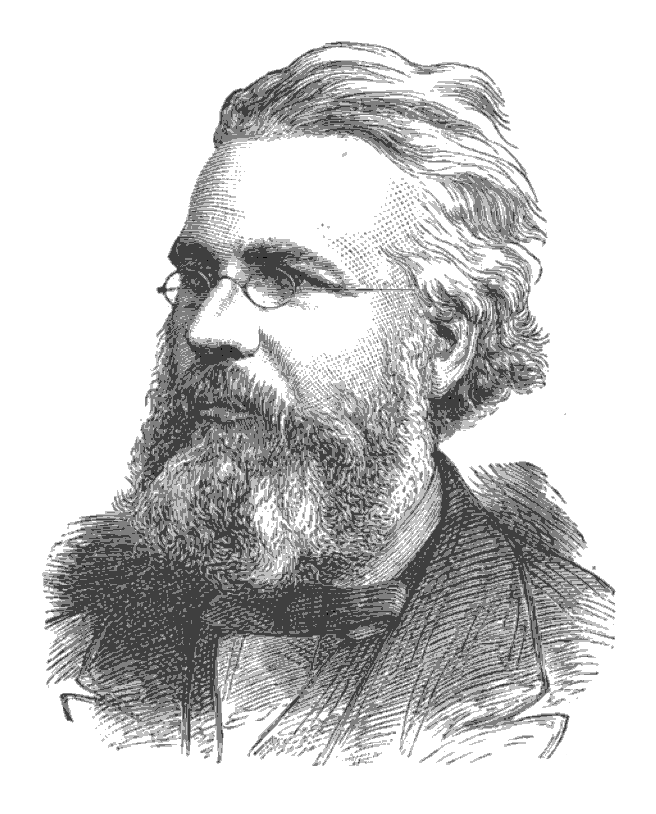
George Smith, of Coalville

George Smith (16 February 1831 – 21 June 1895) was a manager of the Whitwick Colliery Company Tileries in Leicestershire, England during the nineteenth century, who campaigned against industrial child labour. Smith highlighted the plight of children employed in the Leicestershire and Derbyshire brickyards of mid-Victorian England, some of whom were as young as eight years old and worked for up to seventy-five hours a week.

== Life ==
George Smith was born near Tunstall, Staffordshire, on 16 February 1831. His father was a brick maker, and when nine years old George was working thirteen hours a day in the brick fields. Nevertheless, he contrived to obtain some education, so that in time he improved his position, becoming manager of a brick and tile works. In 1857 he discovered, at Coalville, Leicestershire, valuable seams of clay, and on the strength of this discovery organized a large brick-making business there. He advocated legislation in the interests of brick makers, and in particular called attention to the cruelty suffered in the brickfields by child workers, whose claims he pressed at the National Association for the Promotion of Social Science congresses.

In 1871, Smith published The Cry of the Children. This work awoke the interest of the earl of Shaftesbury and of A. J. Mundella, and, in the same year, was passed an act providing for the government inspection of brickyards, and the regulation of juvenile and female labour there. Smith's share in this act aroused great antagonism, and at the end of 1872 he was dismissed from his position at Coalville, and reduced to great poverty. Nevertheless, he turned his attention to the conditions of life of the hundred thousand persons living on canals. As the result of his representations on the subject the Canal Boats Bill was introduced by George Sclater-Booth, 1st Baron Basing(afterwards Lord Basing). This bill, which came into force in 1878, provided for the education of children on canal boats, and regulated the sanitary condition of life on board. In 1884 was passed another bill strengthening the provisions of the first. From that date onwards Smith devoted his attention to improving the condition of Gipsy children which he had described in his Gipsy Life (1880). A Moveable Dwellings Bill embodying his views was several times introduced into parliament, but always defeated.

On one occasion, he repeated a tactic he 'borrowed' from another law reform campaigner, Samuel Plimsoll MP. However, unlike Mr. Plimsoll, Mr. Smith was not a Member of Parliament. When his Bill dealing with brickyard children was passing through the House of Commons, his "breach of order" was committed from the Strangers’ Gallery. It was unsuccessful.

In 1885 Smith received a grant from the Royal Bounty Fund. He died in Crick, Northamptonshire on 21 June 1895.
