= Oscar Wilson (artist) =

Painter and illustrator

- Born: 1867; Hackney, London, England
- Died: 13 July 1930 (aged 62–63); Kensington, London, England
- Occupations: Painter and illustrator
- Years active: 1886–1930

Oscar Wilson RMS ARBA (1867 – 13 July 1930) was an English painter and illustrator who trained in both London and Belgium. He was a painter, illustrator, and joke cartoonist.

== Biography ==
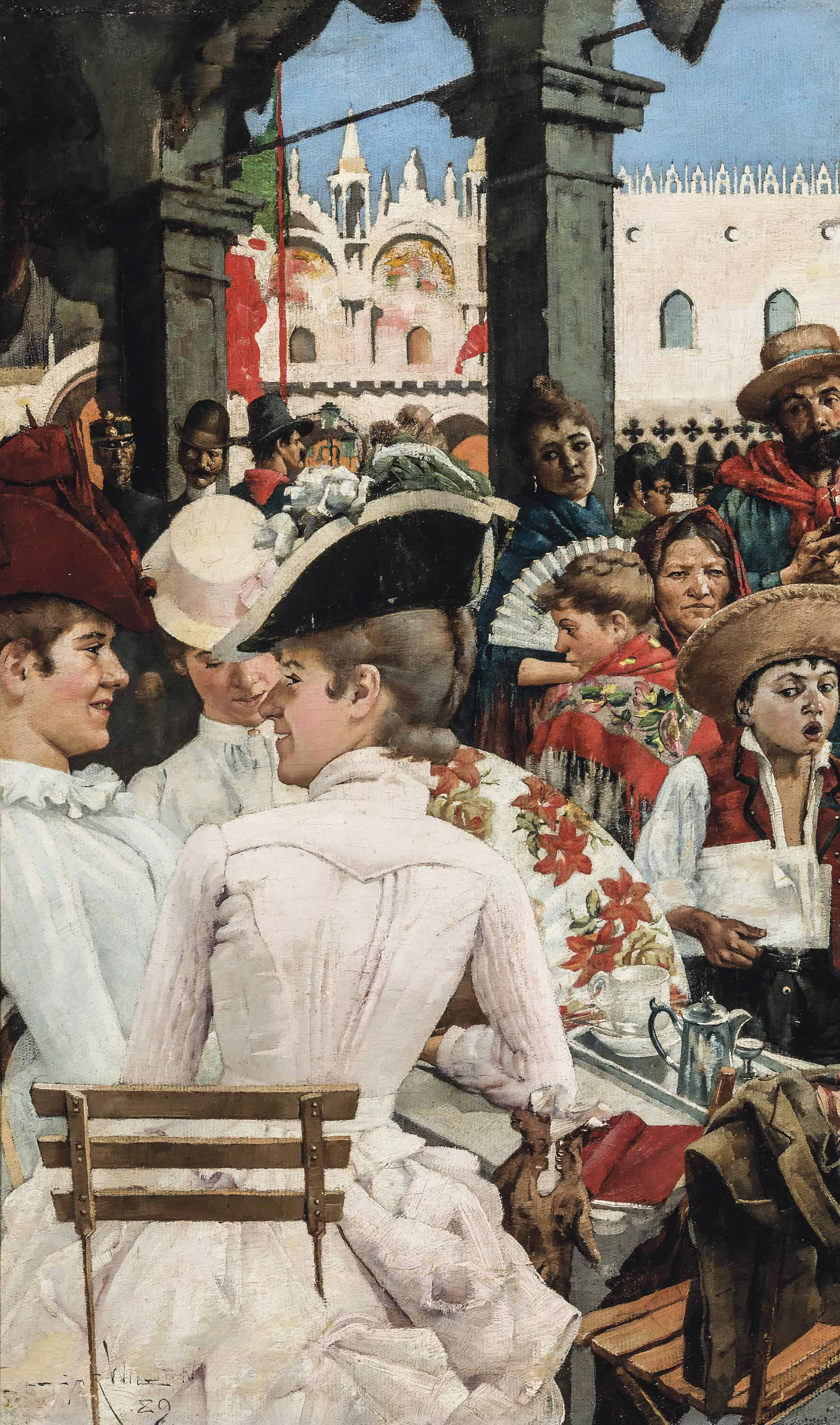
Painting by Wilson: A battle of wits: tourists, pickpockets, and police, St Mark's Square (1889)

The census returns for Oscar Wilson show him as being born c. 1863 in Hackney, London but his Who's Who entry shows his year of birth as 1867. Very little appears to be known about his early life. He trained at the South Kensington School of Art and then at the Antwerp Academy under Charles Verlat and Polydore Beaufaux.

It is not clear when he travelled to Belgium or returned to England. The only child of the marriage, a son, Water was born c. 1890 in Belgium, as was his wife Jeanne (born c. 1871). The 1911 census return shows them as having been married for 25 years, which would give the date of the marriage as 1885, when Jeanne was 14. (Note: It is not clear where they were married. Although Jeanne had been born in Belgium, she was a British citizen by parentage. The Age of Consent was 13 in the UK in 1885, until the Criminal Law Amendment Act 1885 raised it to 16 on 14 August of that year. However they may have married in Belgium.)

Wilson exhibited at the Royal Academy in 1888 and 1889 with his address in Park Cottage, Lee Road, Blackheath, London. However, his son was born in Belgium in c. 1890 and he was in Antwerp in 1891. Wilson was in England in 1894 when he gave evidence in the 'Pick-me-up indecency case in July. In this case the police seized copies of the illustrated paper from stationers Smith and Son in Liverpool on the grounds that the juxtaposition of two illustrations in the magazine produced an indecent image. Wilson was one of the illustrators involved and he gave evidence against the suggestion of indecency.

Benezit reports that Wilson travelled to Africa, it is not certain when this was, but he had an illustration in The Graphic in 1910 showing the call to prayer in Cairo.

The 1901 census shows Wilson living at 19 Colville Road, Notting Hill, London with his wife and son. By 1911 they had moved to 47 Blenheim Crescent, Notting Hill. The census showed also that the couple had had only one child, Walter, now aged 21 and working as a "motor-car agent", i.e. a car salesman. His Who Was Who address was 47 Blenheim Crescent, and he died at his home on 13 July 1930.

== Works ==
Bryant describes him as a painter, illustrator and joke cartoonist. Johnson and Greutzner describe him as a genre painter. Benezit and Micklethwait list him as a genre painter and illustrator of books, magazines and newspapers, and state that he was particularly known for his pictures of pretty women. Wilson also illustrated postcards, at least on World War One topics.

Wilson also engaged in commercial art, producing illustrations, together with others, for two promotional publications by the Great Eastern Railway Company. The first of these was East Coast Pictures by Percy Lindley, intended to encourage people to visit the seaside resorts on the East Coast. The second was To the Continent, intended to promote travel to the Continent via Harwich. A special feature of this publication was the large number of colour illustrations from drawings by Wilson, "showing better than any description could do the luxuries of the Harwich steamboat service."

Wilson was a frequent exhibitor and exhibited as follows:

- Two works at the Dudley Gallery or New Dudley Gallery
- Two works at the Glasgow Institute of the Fine Arts
- 22 works at the Walker Art Gallery, Liverpool
- Eight works at the Manchester City Art Gallery. In 1891 Wilson exhibited The Flower Market, Antwerp at Manchester, which the Manchester Courier called a "remarkably clever picture", stating the Wilson was "strongly under the influence of foreign schools." The "Gazette" went on state that the scene was "full of life and character, and the various groups of flower-girls and of Antwerp civilians are cleverly introduced and painted; the figures have all been carefully studied from life, and represent all types from the well-to-do citizen to the peasant," and that in all respects it was "an admirable example of the artist's work."
- Three works at the Royal Academy. In 1888 the Liverpool Mercury listed his L'Amateur d' Estampes as another "good pictures among the oils."
- 13 works at the Royal Society of British Artists. At the Winter Exhibition of the society in 1891, Wilson exhibited La Modiste, which the Acton Gazette described as a "luminous little bit". In 1892 Wilson exhibited pictures showing scenes in Antwerp which St James's Gazette considered to be "quite interesting, mainly by reason of the excellent arrangement of colour" and said that the catalogue illustrations did not do them justice.
- Seven works at the Royal Cambrian Academy
- Two works at the Royal Institute of Painters in Water Colours
- One work at the Royal Miniature Society (Note: This was presumably Playmates showing a child and a kitten playing, which he exhibited at the first exhibition of the society in 1896.)
- 25 works at the Royal Institute of Oil Painters
- Three works at the Royal Scottish Academy. In 1928, Still Life by Wilson was sold from the exhibition of the Academy.

Wilson exhibited at other venues, including the Leeds Municipal Art Gallery in 1890, where he showed Mon Atelier, showing a sculptor's studio, lined with classical casts which are being studied by fashionably dressed lady. The Yorkshire Post considered that the painting was "admirable in tone, and full of sound workmanship, while if the figure introduced some respects rather jarring note, it gives a humorous turn to the spectator's thoughts by reason of the contrast it affords." (Note: It is note clear if this painting is the same as Idling which is in the Bolton Museum and Art Gallery, which also features a woman in a pink dress studying a document in a sculptor's studio.) In 1897 Wilson exhibited at the Black and White gallery, where his work was described as "Brilliant, somewhat French in influence, and entirely modern in feeling" His pieceOutside the Empire was described as a "clever and characteristic example of this artist's skill in depicting the modern woman as he sees her."

Wilson was one of the initial members of the Society of Painters in Miniature (led by Alyn Williams) in 1896, the year of its founding. (Note: Two Societies of Miniature Painters formed almost simultaneously in the Spring of 1896. One, led by Alfred Praga, was formed in May, and the other, under Alyn Williams, was formed within a week of the first society, in ignorance of its formation. Both had the same title, but in October the society led by Praga changed its name to "The Society of Miniaturists". It became the Royal Society of Miniature Painters in 1904, and became the Royal Society of Miniature Painters, Sculptors & Gravers in 1926. The Society of Miniaturists eventually merged with the British Society of Painters (founded in 1987) and the British Watercolour Society.) The society restricted itself to fifty members who were professional artists. At the first exhibition of the society he showed Playmates with a child and a kitten playing together next to an array of valuable pottery. He was elected an Associate of the Royal Society of British Artists in 1926.

== Magazine illustration ==
Wilson's Who Was Who entry (Note: These entries are taken from Who's Who entries, which are based on a questionnaire filled in by the subject themselves.) states that he had drawn for all the principle magazines and newspapers. Among these his illustrations appeared in were:

- Black and White
- Cassell's Family Magazine
- The English Illustrated Magazine
- The Gaiety
- The Gentlewoman
- The Graphic
- The Idler
- The Illustrated London News
- The Illustrated Sporting and Dramatic News
- The Lady's Pictorial
- The Lady's Realm
- London Opinion
- Madame
- New Budget
- The Pall Mall Magazine
- Pearson's Magazine
- Pick-Me-Up
- The Sketch
- St Paul's Magazine
- Tatler
- The West End Review
- The Windsor Magazine

The editor of Pick-Me-Up stated that Wilson was one of his five staff artists. Wilson's magazine illustrations were well regarded. He was the second in a list of nine artists whose work was purchased for their Art Gallery by Preston Corporation in 1913. The artists were described as being "amongst the finest artists of the day".

Reviewers repeatedly heaped praise on the illustrations by Wilson, and what is more to the point, they often singled out his work from that of up to a dozen other artists illustrating the magazine, in very short single paragraph reviews of the magazines:

- 1894 "The coloured supplement to St. Paul's This week is a really exquisite study of a trim little milliner by Oscar Wilson."
- 1895 "St Paul's contains many clever and piquant pictures. There is a charming coloured plate, by Oscar Wilson, of the dainty Lady Kitty, (Note: Lady Kitty appeared on the front cover of St. Paul's in a different costume every week.) whose social adventures are quite a feature of this popular weekly."
- 1896 "St. Paul's is very delightful with several coloured illustrations, including a dainty study, The Favourite by Oscar Wilson."
- 1896 St. Paul's delights it readers ever week with some pages of coloured sketches by Mr Oscar Wilson and others.
- 1896 (in a review of St. Paul's) "Two coloured full page illustrations, An Encore, by Oscar Wilson and Mars and Venus by T. Manuel are simply bewitching."
- 1896 "Amongst the weeklies St. Paul's is strong in sport and drama, and in coloured pictures, the best of which is OScar Wilson's In Wild March.
- 1896 (in a review of St. Paul's) "two dainty full page tinted pictures by Oscar Wilson."
- 1896 "St. Paul's has a charming coloured sketch by Mr. Oscar Wilson of a flower girl..."
- 1896 (in a review of St. Paul's) "The Children's Hero is a capital sketch of the pantomime clown by Mr Oscar Wilson."
- 1898 (in a review of the West End Review) "Oscar Wilson's Balloon Man is a good example of the lighter side of art."
- 1898 (in a review of St. Paul's) " . . . a clever drawing by Mr Oscar Wilson"
- 1898 (in a review of The English Illustrated Magazine) ". . . the up to date artists, Oscar Wilson and Hal Hurst"
- 1898 (in a review of The Sketch) "There are clever and characteristic sketches of frivolous femininity by Mr Dudley Hardy and Mr Oscar Wilson"
- 1899 (in a review of the West End Review) "There is a full page picture besides, by Oscar Wilson, worth all the money called The First Ice of Summer."
- 1899 (in a review of Black and White) "The double page picture by Oscar Wilson, The Judgement of Paris is excellent."
- 1900 (in a review of The Lady's Pictorial) "There is a very nice picture by Oscar Wilson"
- 1906 (in a review of Tatler) "Oscar Wilson contributes two excellent pictures in The Piazza, Venice, and The Broken Pitcher"

== Book illustrations ==
Wilson illustrated dozens of books. Initially, most of his illustration work was for Ward Lock & Co but after 1905 it was almost all for the Society for Promoting Christian Knowledge (SPCK). Most of the following list has been sourced from a search on the Jisc Library Hub Discover database, (Note: The Jisc Library Hub Discover brings together the catalogues of 168 major UK and Irish libraries. Additional libraries are being added all the time, and the catalogue collates national, university, and research libraries.) supplemented by searches in newspaper archives. The list is probably not complete, as reviews and advertisements do not always give the name of the illustrator. The sources of the entries is the Jisc database search, unless otherwise noted.

Books illustrated by Wilson
Ser	Year	Author	Title	London publisher	Pages	Notes
1	1895	Theodora C. Elmslie	The Little Lady of Lavender	Collins	312 p. [4] col. ill., (8º)	
2	1900	Richard Marsh	Ada Vernham Actress	John Long	272 p., fs., (8º)	
3	1902	Richard Marsh	Between the Dark and the Daylight	Digby, Long & Co	2, 327, 17 p., (8º)	
4	1902	E. Phillips Oppenheim	The Traitors	Ward Lock & Co	304, 16 p., 2 ill., (8º)	
5	1903	E. Phillips Oppenheim	A Prince of Sinners	Ward Lock & Co	328 p., 3 ill., (8º)	
6	1903	Guy Boothby	A Two-Fold Inheritance etc.	Ward Lock & Co	319 p., 8vo.	
7	1903	Guy Boothby	Connie Burt etc.	Ward Lock & Co	iv, 318, 2 p., 4 ill., 8vo.	
8	1903	Beatrice Heron-Maxwell	The Queen Regent	Ward Lock & Co	317 p., (8º)	
9	1903	E. Phillips Oppenheim	The Yellow Crayon	Ward Lock & Co	288 p., 2 ill., (8º)	
10	1904	Headon Hill	A Race With Ruin etc.	Ward Lock & Co	318 p., (8º)	
11	1904	Mrs. Tom Godfrey	Sunbeam	Ward Lock & Co	320 p., (8º)	
12	1904	John Kirkwood Leys	The House-Boat Mystery etc.	Ward Lock & Co	294 p., fs., (8º)	
13	1904	Edgar Turner	The Lady and The Burglar: A Fantastic Romance etc.	Ward Lock & Co	317 p., (8º)	
14	1904	Herbert Maxwell	The Unclaimed Million etc.	Ward Lock & Co	315 p. : 1 ill., (8º)	
15	1905	Grace I. Whitham	The last of the White Coats : a story of Cavaliers and Roundheads	Seeley & Co, Ltd.	319, 16 p., 8 col. ill., (8º)	
16	1906	M. Bramston	The Fortunes of Junia. A Story for Girls	SPCK	159 p., (8º)	
17	1908	H. L. Bedford	Barbara's Heroes Ancient and Modern etc.	SPCK	150 p., (8º)	
18	1908	Edward Ebenezer Crake	Dame Joan of Pevensey: A Sussex Tale	SPCK	160 p., 2 ill., (8º)	
19	1908	William Webster	Hearty Gray : A Tale of The East Coast	SPCK	157 p., (8º)	
20	1908	Catherine Mary MacSorley	Nora: An Irish Story	SPCK	159 p., (8º)	
21	1908	Charlotte Elizabeth Baron	Phil's Hero or A Street Arab's Resolve	Religious Tract Society	248 p. [2] ill., (8º)	
22	1908	Elizabeth Ken	The Lost Will	SPCK	160 p., (8º)	
23	1908	William A. Bryce, H. De Vere Stacpoole	The Reavers : A Tale of Wild Adventure On The Moors of Lorne	SPCK	160 p., (8º)	
24	1909	George Manville Fenn	Jack the Rascal	Everett & Co	317 p., 5 col. ill., (8º)	
25	1909	F. Bayford Harrison	The Usual Half-Crown : A Tale	SPCK	156 p., (8º)	
26	1909	Alice Massie	Two in A Tangle	SPCK	158 p., (8º)	
27	1909	L. E. Tiddeman	When Bab Was Young	SPCK	160 p., (8º)	
28	1910	Harrison L. Bedford	Drusilla The Second	SPCK	158 p., (8º)	
29	1910	Elizabeth Ken	Less Than Kin etc.. [A Tale.]	SPCK	155 p., (8º)	
30	1910	L. E. Tiddeman	Next-Door Gwennie	SPCK	v, 156 p. : ill., (8º)	
31	1910	Bessie Marchant	The Deputy Boss. A Tale of British Honduras	SPCK	vii, 157 p., 3 ill., (8º)	
32	1911	Mabel Escombe	A Child of Surprises	SPCK	158 p., (8º)	
33	1911	Austin Clare	Another Pair of Shoes. A Northumbrian Story	SPCK	158 p., (8º)	
34	1911	Guy Thorne	Divorce	Greening & Co	256 p. : 1 ill., (8º)	(Note: The publisher described the book (in their shilling series) as having a striking wrapper design by Wilson.)
35	1911	L. E. Tiddeman	Nancy and Her Cousins	SPCK	156 p. : 1 col. ill., (8º)	
36	1911	Mrs. Arthur G. K. Woodgate	Queen Mab. in Words of Two Syllables	SPCK	160 p., (8º)	
37	1911	Eric Scott Clement	Queen of all hearts: A Stage Story	Greening & Co	320 p., col. fs., (8º)	
38	1911	Mrs. Hobart-Hampden	The Cave of Hanuman	SPCK	154 p., (8º)	
39	1911	Annie Victoria Dutton	The Children of The Cliff; or The Smugglers' Hole	SPCK	124p, (8º)	
40	1912	Jessie Challacombe	David's Diaconate; or Gathering Up The Fragments etc.	SPCK	157 p., (8º)	
41	1912	Violet T. Kirke	Martin Spade; or Seven Foot Martin	SPCK	128 p., (8º)	
42	1912	M. Bramston	Pastor Oberlin. A Family Chronicle of The Eighteenth Century	SPCK	159 p., (8º)	
43	1912	Helen K. Watts	The Nevilles	SPCK	160 p., (8º)	
44	1912	Jessie Challacombe	Wait and Win	SPCK	v, 159 p., 8vo.	
45	1913	Charlotte Ainsley Gillespy	Guinevere; or The Ladder of Love	SPCK	128 p., 1 ill., (8º)	
46	1913	A. Vaughan	Scamp Number Two : The Story of A Child's Simple Faith and A Man's Unbelief	SPCK	160 p., (8º)	
47	1913	F. Bayford Harrison	The Treasure of Spanish Villa	SPCK	160 p., 3 col. Ill., (8º)	
48	1914	Ida Lemon	De Beaufoy's Bride	SPCK	159 p., 3 col. ill., (8º)	
49	1914	Agnes Theresa Holliday	Five and One	SPCK	160, 16 p., 3 ill., (8º)	
50	1914	Harry Collingwood	In search of El Dorado	Sampson Low, Marston and Co	viii, 312 p., 4 ill. (1 col.), (8º)	
51	1916	Elizabeth Ken	How Rhoda Went Abroad : A Story of A Missionary Exhibition	George Allen & Unwin	349 p., 1 ill., (8º)	
52	1916	George Agnew Chamberlain	The Long Divorce : A Novel	SPCK	128 p. : 1 col. ill., (8º)	
53	1917	Grace I. Whitham	The Adventures of A Cavalier : A Story of The Days of Cavaliers & Roundheads	Seeley, Service & Co	319 p., col. ill., (8º)	
54	1918	Geoffrey Arundel Whitworth	The Bells of Paradise	Andrew Melrose	vii, 300 p., (8º)	
55	1920	Margaret J. M. Bolland	A Little Pair of Pilgrims	SPCK	v, 159 p., (8º)	
56	1920	Margaret J. M. Bolland	The Blue Geranium	SPCK	v, 151 p., (8º)	
57	1923	A. Eva Richardson	The Moon Lady	Sheldon Press (SPCK)	160 p., (8º)	
58	1923	M. F. Hutchinson	Three in A Bungalow	Sheldon Press (SPCK)	123 p., (8º)	
59	1927	Elizabeth Grierson	Bishop Patteson of the Cannibal Islands	Seeley, Service & Co	182 p., (8º)	

=== Example of book illustration by Wilson ===
Among the books that Wilson illustrated was Two Adventurers in Search for El Dorado (Samuel Low, Marston and Co., London, 1915) by Harry Collingwood. Images by courtesy of the Internet Archive.

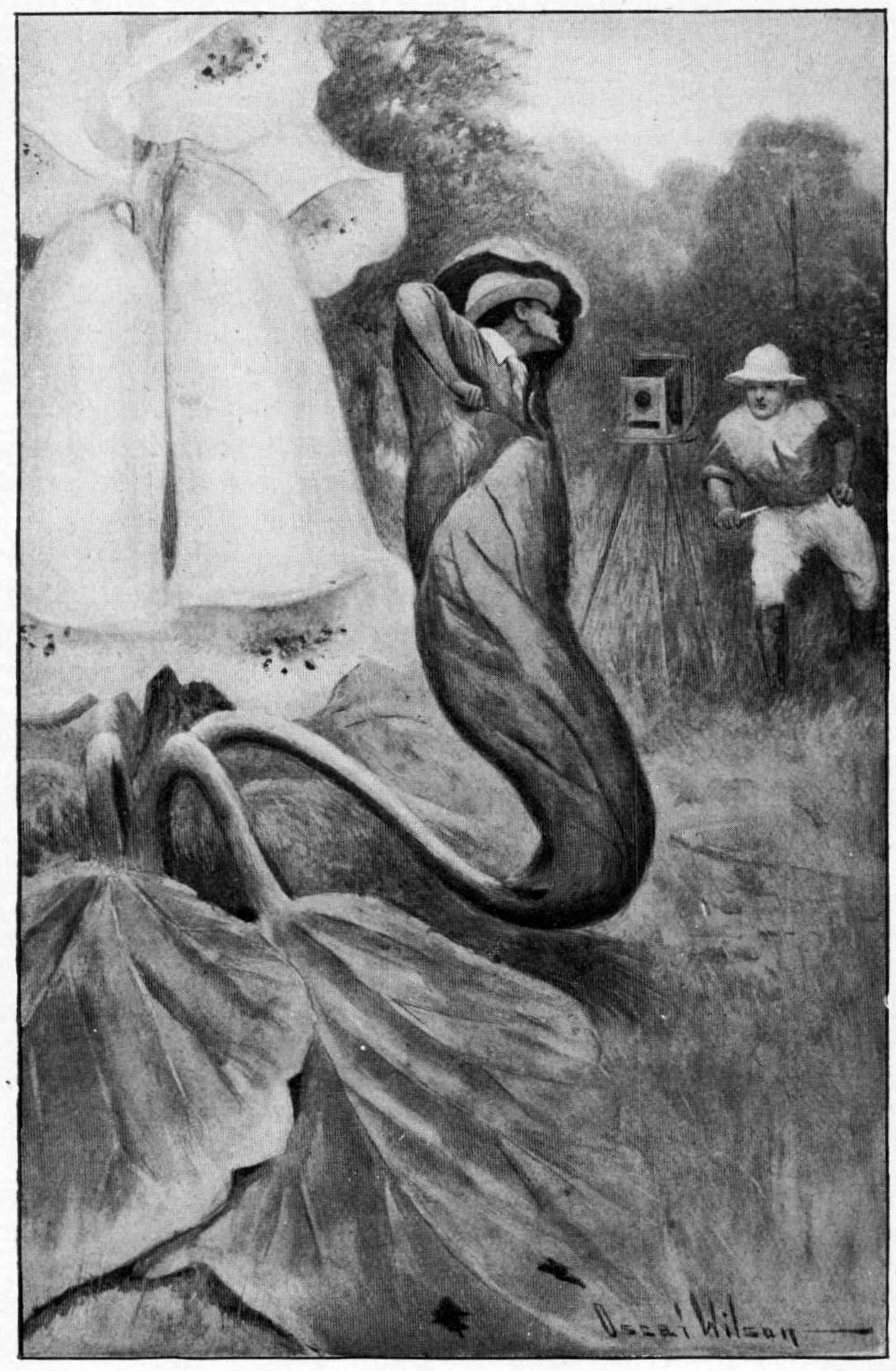
The huge leaf of the carnivorous plant suddenly curled up capturing his companion

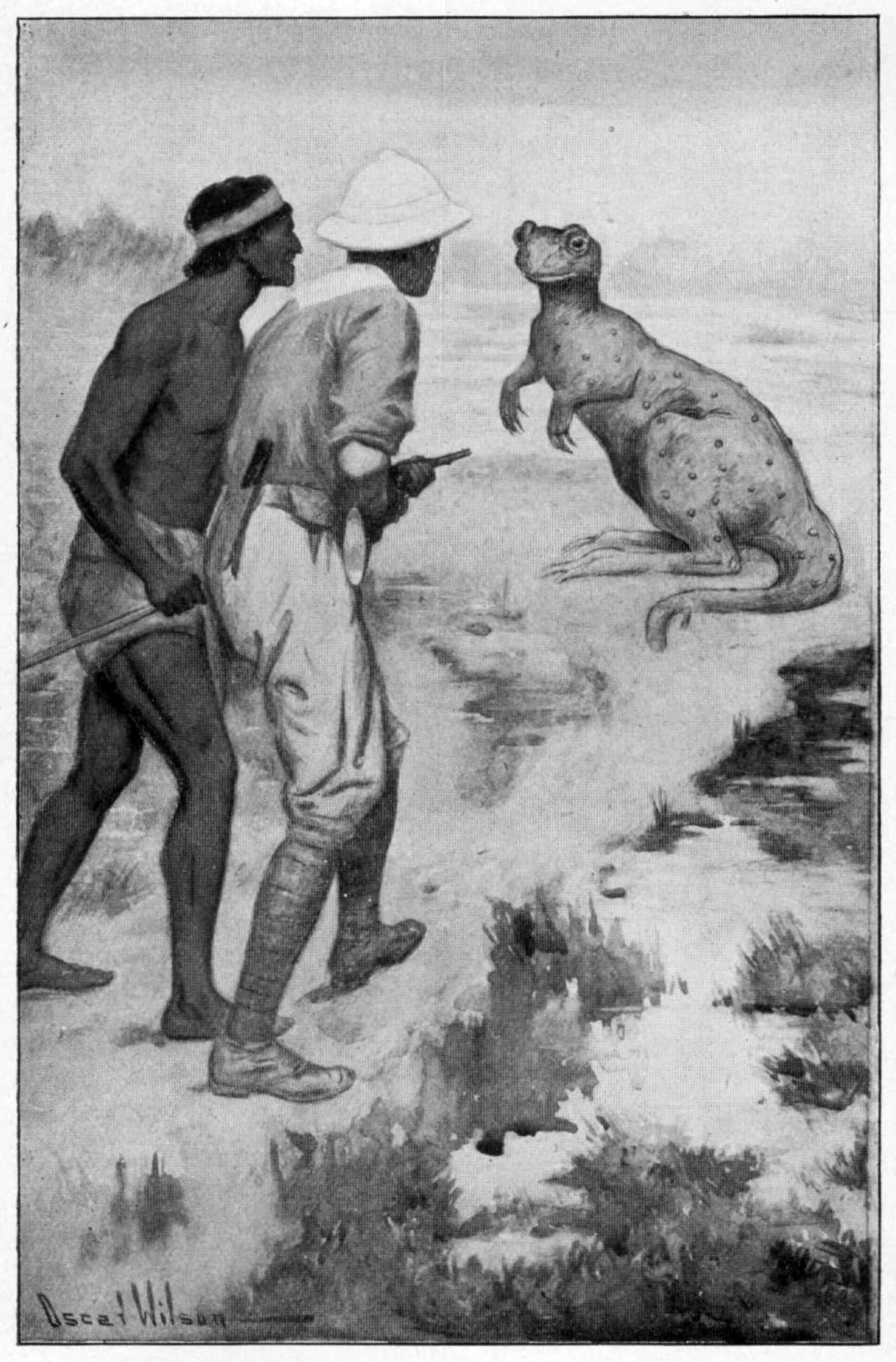
Never before in his life had he seen such a creature

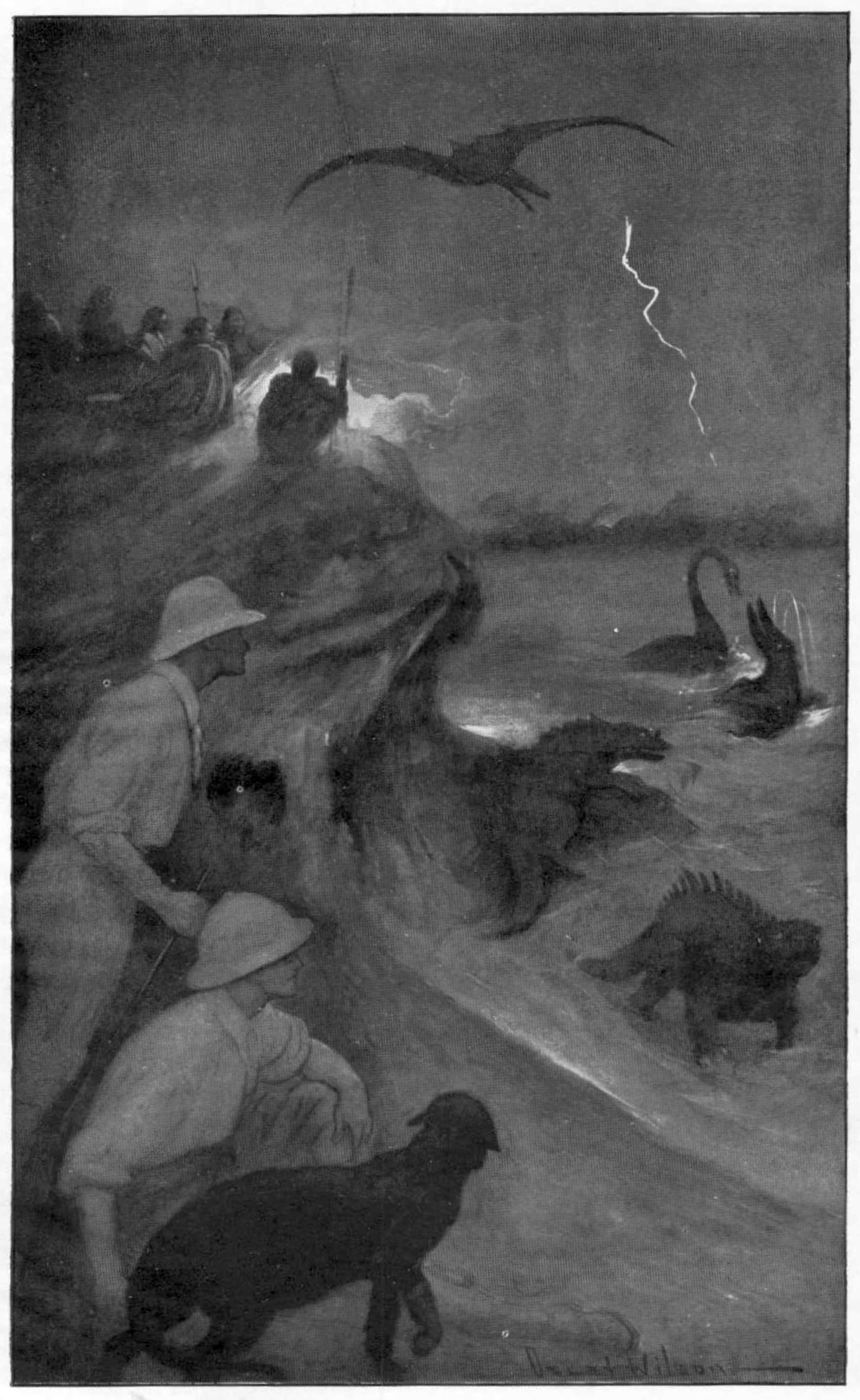
He saw enough to fully confirm his previous conviction

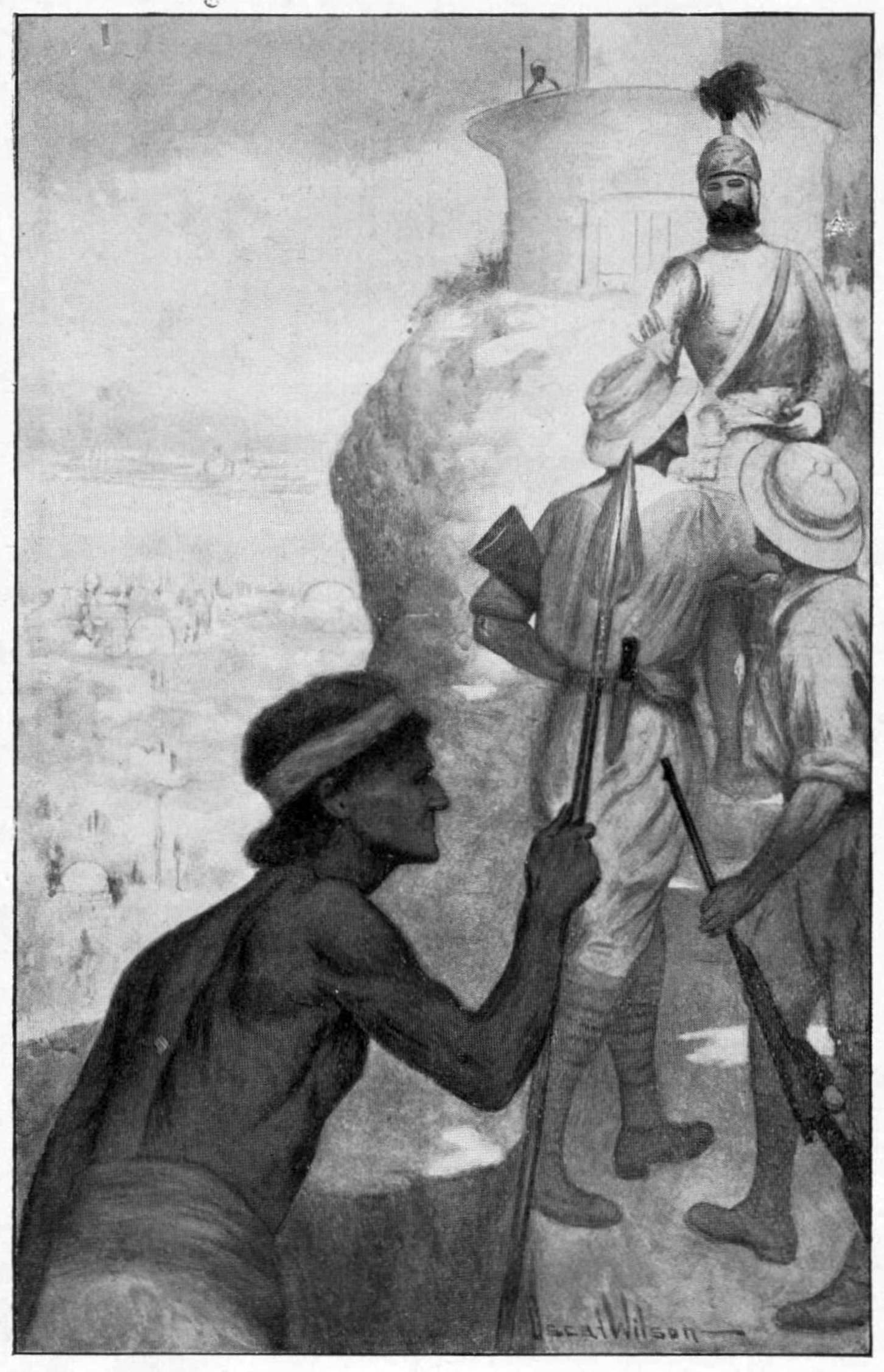
They present themselves at the guard gate
