= Hal Hurst =

English painter (1865–1938)

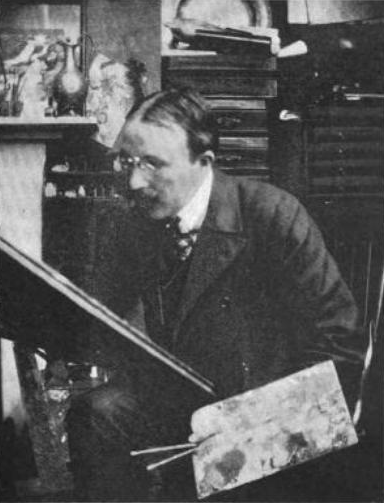
- In The Sketch, 24 October 1900
- Born: Henry William Lowe Hurst; 26 August 1865; London, England
- Died: 23 December 1938 (aged 73)
- Occupation: Artist

Henry William Lowe "Hal" Hurst, RI RBA ROI RMS (1865–1938) was an English painter, etcher, miniaturist, illustrator and founding member of the Royal Miniature Society.

== Life and work ==
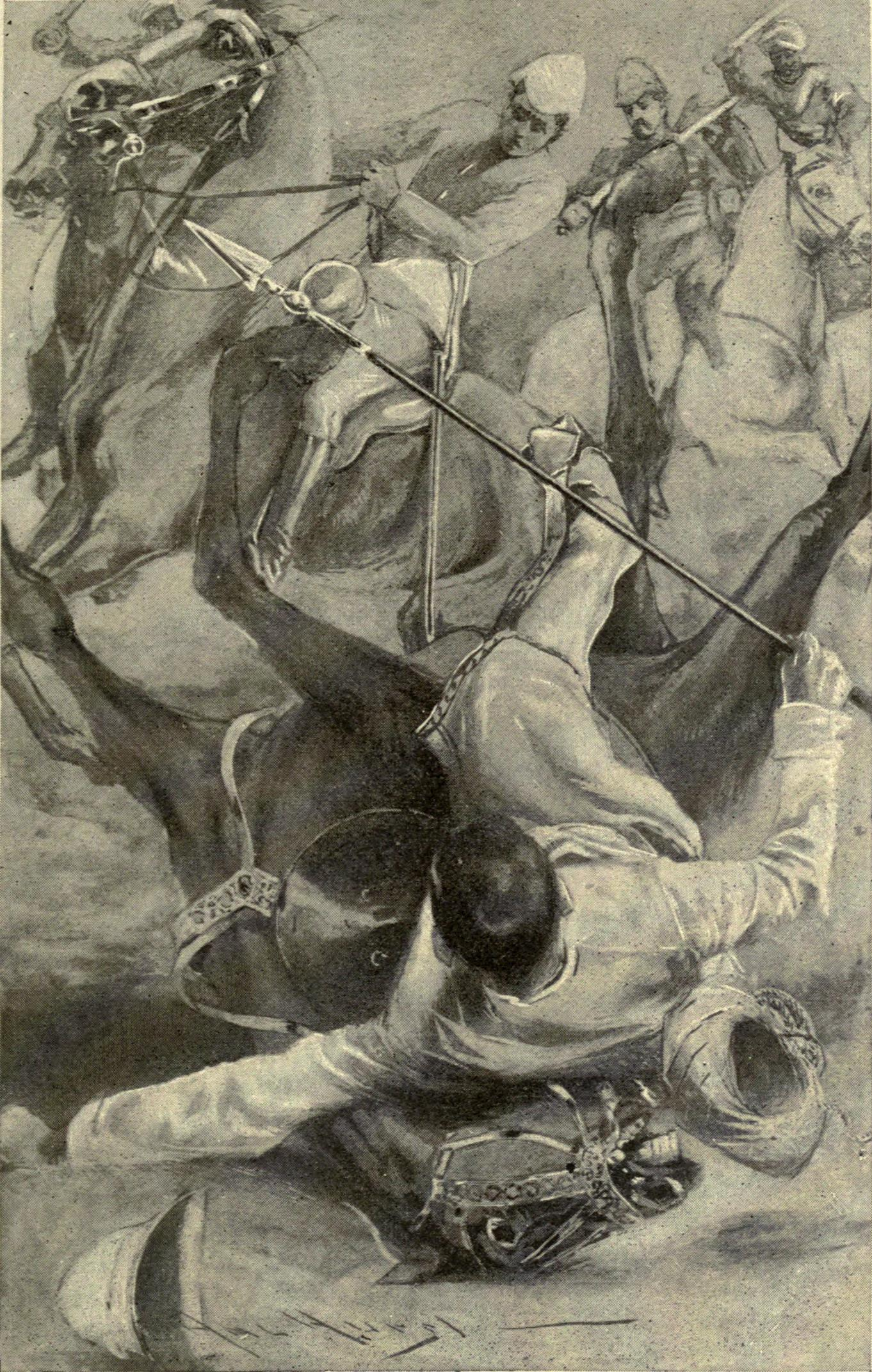
Percy Groves in the Battle of Chillianwalla

Born Henry William Lowe Hurst in London on 26 August 1865, he was the son of Henry Hurst, a well-known African traveller and publisher (Hurst and Blackett). He was educated at St. Paul's School in London and soon after started recording the political instability of Ireland through drawings and illustrations. He travelled to the United States of America where he found work illustrating newspapers in New York City and Philadelphia. Hal returned to Europe studying art at the Royal Academy Schools and the Académie Julian in Paris. He exhibited extensively at all the principal London galleries and was elected member of the Royal Society of British Artists in 1896, Royal Institute of Painters in Water Colours in 1898, and the Royal Institute of Oil Painters in 1900. He was a founder member of the Royal Miniature Society from its inception in 1896 and elected vice-president, a position he held until stepping down in 1913 – he was given the distinction of honorary member status the following year.

Hal shared a studio at 23a South Audley Street, Mayfair, London with Alyn Williams founder of the Royal Miniature Society. An motivated, prolific and respected artist, Hal illustrated in excess of 20 published books including Mark Twain's The American Claimant. In addition, his illustrations were published in Punch, Harper's Weekly, Vanity Fair, The Idler and the Illustrated London News, amongst others.

He married and had one son and two daughters with whom he lived at 9 Colville Mansions, Bayswater. He was the friend and neighbour of Douglas Sladen, the well-known author and travel writer, who also owned many of Hurst's paintings. Sladen described Hurst as being "a very clever artist" and having a "beautiful young wife."

The National Art Library, London holds letters written by Hurst to Sir Isidore Spielmann and Reginald S. Hunt. Hal Hurst died on 23 December 1938.

== Exhibitions ==
=== Solo ===
- Exhibition of paintings & sketches by Hal Hurst, R.B.A. – The Modern Gallery (1899), London
- "Facts and fancies" in oil and water colour by Hal Hurst, R.I., R.B.A. – The Dore Gallery, London
- Exhibition of Water Colours by Hal Hurst, H.R.M.S., R.B.A., R.I – Winnipeg Art Gallery, Canada

=== Group ===
- London of today together with some portraits by Hal Hurst, R.I., R.B.A., V.P.R.M.S. – The Dore Gallery, London
- Exposition Universalle – Paris (1900)

== Partial bibliography ==
=== Illustrations for books ===
- From Whose Bourne (1893) (written by Robert Barr and Luke Sharpe)
- A Woman Intervenes (written by Robert Barr and Luke Sharpe)
- The Serious Wooing (1908) (written by John Oliver Hobbes, pseud Pearl Mary-Teresa Craigie)
- The American Claimant (1892) (written by Mark Twain; co-illustrator Dan Beard)
- Sir Roger's Heir – a Period Romance (1904) (written by F. Frankfort Moore)
- The Knights of the White Rose (written by George Griffith)
- Sappers and Miners or The Flood Beneath the Sea (c.1900) (written by George Manville Fenn)
- Sou'wester And Sword: A Story of Struggle on Sea And Land (1917) (written by Hugh St. Leger)
- Novel Notes (1893) (written by Jerome K. Jerome)
- Those Children (1899) (written by Curtis Yorke)
- The Great Court Scandal (1907) (written by William Le Queux)
- Through the Sikh War: A Tale Of The Conquest Of The Punjaur (c.1890) (written by G. A. Henty)
- Hunting for Gold, or Adventures in Klondyke (1897) (written by Hume Nisbet)
- Vernon's Aunt: Being the Oriental Experiences of Miss Lavinia Moffat (1894) (written by Sara Jeannette Duncan (Mrs. Everard Cotes))
- The Stir Outside The Cafe Royal; A Story Of Miss Van Snoop Detective: The Harmsworth Magazine Volume I 1898-9 (1899) (written by Clarence Rook)
- The Billsbury Election and Other Papers from Punch; With twenty-eight illustrations by Hal Hurst (1892) (written by Rudolf Chambers Lehmann)
- The Arcadians: Souvenir Presented By Robert Courtneidge on the Occasion of the Second Anniversary Friday 28 April 1911 (1911) (written by Robert Courtneidge)
- The Pictorial Record (1887) (written by Walter Tomlinson, with special articles by Thomas W. Harris, Charles Estcourt, and Joseph Nodal. Edited by John Howard Nodal)
- A Woman of the Commune (1896) (written by G. A. Henty)
- A Servant of the Public (c.1900) (written by Anthony Hope)
- Ships That Pass in the Night (1905) (written by Beatrice Harraden)
- The Viper of Milan (written by Marjorie Bowen)

=== Illustrations for periodicals and magazines ===
- Harper's Weekly (18 February 1888)
- Vanity Fair Cycling in Hyde Park (11 June 1896)
- Illustrated London News Cup Day at Ascot (25 June 1898)
- Illustrated London News (Christmas 1901)
- Cassell's Family Magazine Cover illustration
- The Idler (June 1893)
