= Alice Mott =

English miniature-painter (1877–1908)

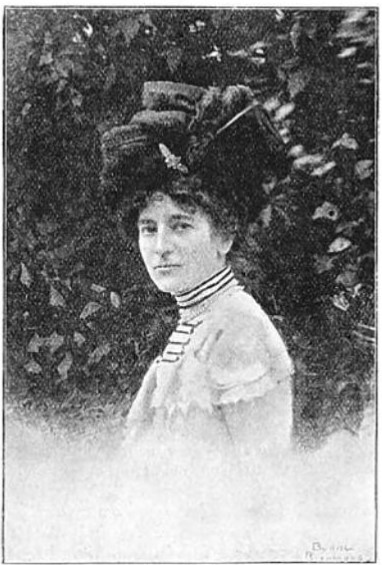
Alice Mott pictured in 1900

Alice Mott (1877–1908) was an English miniature-painter.

Born at Walton-on-Thames, she was a pupil of the Slade School, and studied at the British Museum to qualify for the Royal Academy. She then studied painting in Paris with Charles Joshua Chaplin. She conducted her own study of old miniaturists and took up painting portraits in miniature, which she exhibited at the Royal Academy and the Paris Salon.

In 1896 she co-founded the Society of Miniature Painters with Josephine Gibson, Mabel Hobson, Alyn Williams, Edward Poynter, and Lawrence Alma-Tadema.
