= October 27 =

October 27 this year in various calendars
- Tuesday, 27 October 2026
Akan	Nwonabene
Armenian	9 Trē 1476
Aztec	Atlcahualo 5, 5 Tecpatl
Babylonian	14 Tashritu, 2337 SE
Balinese pawukon	Menga, Beteng, Menala, Paing, Aryang, Anggara of Watugunung, Yama, Ogan, Suka
Bengali	11 Kartik, BS 1433
Chinese	Yang Wood Dog・Encampment Mansion; Fire Horse Year, Month 9, Day 18 (Shuangjiang, 11 days until Lidong)
Common Era	27 October 2026 CE
Coptic	17 Paopi, AM 1743
Egyptian	14 Phamenoth, 2775 NE
Ethiopian	17 Ṭeqemt, 2019 Amätä Məhrät
French Republican	Décade I, Quintidi de Brumaire de l'Année 235 de la République
Gregorian	27 October, AD 2026
Hebrew	16 Cheshvan, AM 5787
Hindu	Bharaṇī・Siddhi; Solar: 10 Kārtika, 1948 SE; Lunisolar: Pratipada, Kṛishna pakṣa of Āśvina, 2083 VE; Rāudra・5127 KY・1,872,875
Icelandic	Þriðjudagur, 4 Gormánuður 2026
Islamic	15 Jumada al-awwal, AH 1448 (using tabular method)
ISO week date	2026-W44-2
Japanese	17 Nagatsuki, Reiwa 8 (Sōkō, 11 days until Rittō)
Julian	14 October, AD 2026 (AM 7535)
Julian day	2461341
Korean	17 Gaedal, 4359 DE
Maya	13.0.14.0.18; 11 Zac, 5 Etznab
Roman	Pridie Idus Octobres, MMDCCLXXIX AUC
Solar Hijri	5 Aban, SH 1405
Tibetan	16 tha skar, me pho rta 2153 or 1772 or 1000

<<	October					>>
Su	Mo	Tu	We	Th	Fr	Sa
				1	2	3
4	5	6	7	8	9	10
11	12	13	14	15	16	17
18	19	20	21	22	23	24
25	26	27	28	29	30	31
2026

October 27 in recent years
2026 (Tuesday)
2025 (Monday)
2024 (Sunday)
2023 (Friday)
2022 (Thursday)
2021 (Wednesday)
2020 (Tuesday)
2019 (Sunday)
2018 (Saturday)
2017 (Friday)

October 27 is the 300th day of the year (301st in leap years) in the Gregorian calendar; 65 days remain until the end of the year.

== Events ==
=== Pre-1600 ===
- 312 – Constantine the Great is said to have received his famous Vision of the Cross.
- 625 – Election of Pope Honorius I following the death of Pope Boniface V two days prior.
- 1275 – Traditional founding of the city of Amsterdam.
- 1524 – French troops lay siege to Pavia.
- 1553 – Condemned as a heretic, Michael Servetus is burned at the stake just outside Geneva.

=== 1601–1900 ===
- 1644 – Second Battle of Newbury in the English Civil War.
- 1674 – The French garrison in Grave surrenders the town to a Dutch army after a difficult siege.
- 1682 – Philadelphia is founded in the Commonwealth of Pennsylvania.
- 1726 – J. S. Bach leads the first performance of Ich will den Kreuzstab gerne tragen, BWV 56, one of few works he called a cantata.
- 1775 – King George III expands on his Proclamation of Rebellion in the Thirteen Colonies in his speech from the throne at the opening of Parliament.
- 1795 – The United States and Spain sign the Treaty of Madrid, which establishes the boundaries between Spanish colonies and the U.S.
- 1806 – The French Army under Napoleon enters Berlin following the Prussian defeat at the Battle of Jena–Auerstedt.
- 1810 – United States annexes the former Spanish colony of West Florida.
- 1838 – Missouri governor Lilburn Boggs issues the Extermination Order, which orders all Mormons to leave the state or be killed.
- 1863 – American Civil War: Union forces led by General William F. Smith defeat Confederate forces in the Battle of Brown's Ferry, opening up a supply line to the besieged city of Chattanooga, Tennessee.
- 1864 – American Civil War: Union General Benjamin Butler launches an attack during the Siege of Petersburg with the Battle of Fair Oaks & Darbytown Road, but is repulsed by the next day.
- 1870 – Franco-Prussian War: Marshal Bazaine surrenders to Prussian forces at the conclusion of the Siege of Metz along with 140,000 French soldiers.

=== 1901–present ===
- 1907 – Fifteen people are killed in Hungary when gendarmes opened fire on a crowd gathered at a church consecration.
- 1913 – A rail workers' strike in Chile escalates into a general strike, organized by the Regional Workers' Federation of Chile.
- 1914 – World War I: The new British battleship HMS Audacious is sunk by a minefield laid by the armed German merchant-cruiser Berlin.
- 1916 – Negus Mikael, marching on the Ethiopian capital in support of his son Emperor Iyasu V, is defeated by Fitawrari Habte Giyorgis, securing the throne for Empress Zewditu I.
- 1919 – The Fourth Regional Congress of Peasants, Workers and Insurgents is held by the Makhnovshchina at Oleksandrivsk.
- 1922 – A referendum in Rhodesia rejects the country's annexation to the South African Union.
- 1924 – The Uzbek SSR is founded in the Soviet Union.
- 1930 – Ratifications are exchanged in London for the first London Naval Treaty go into effect immediately, further limiting the expensive naval arms race among its five signatories.
- 1936 – Abdication Crisis: Mrs. Wallis Simpson obtains her divorce, which would eventually allow her to marry King Edward VIII of the United Kingdom, thus forcing his abdication from the throne.
- 1944 – World War II: German forces capture Banská Bystrica during Slovak National Uprising thus bringing it to an end.
- 1948 – A deadly smog event begins in Donora, Pennsylvania, eventually killing 20 and sickening thousands.
- 1954 – Benjamin O. Davis, Jr. becomes the first African-American general in the United States Air Force.
- 1958 – Iskander Mirza, the first President of Pakistan, is deposed by General Ayub Khan, who had been appointed the enforcer of martial law by Mirza 20 days earlier.
- 1961 – NASA tests the first Saturn I rocket in Mission Saturn-Apollo 1.
- 1962 – Major Rudolf Anderson of the United States Air Force becomes the only direct human casualty of the Cuban Missile Crisis when his U-2 reconnaissance airplane is shot down over Cuba by a Soviet-supplied surface-to-air missile.
- 1962 – By refusing to agree to the firing of a nuclear torpedo at a US warship, Vasily Arkhipov averts nuclear war.
- 1964 – Ronald Reagan delivers a speech on behalf of the Republican candidate for president, Barry Goldwater. The speech launches his political career and comes to be known as "A Time for Choosing".
- 1971 – The Democratic Republic of the Congo is renamed Zaire.
- 1979 – Saint Vincent and the Grenadines gains its independence from the United Kingdom.
- 1980 – The Chun Doo-hwan government forcibly arrests and investigates monks and personnel of the Jogye Order.
- 1981 – Cold War: The Soviet submarine S-363 runs aground on the east coast of Sweden.
- 1986 – The British government suddenly deregulates financial markets, leading to a total restructuring of the way in which they operate in the country, in an event now referred to as the Big Bang.
- 1988 – Cold War: Ronald Reagan suspends construction of the new U.S. Embassy in Moscow due to Soviet listening devices in the building structure.
- 1991 – Turkmenistan achieves independence from the Soviet Union.
- 1992 – United States Navy radioman Allen R. Schindler, Jr. is murdered by shipmate Terry M. Helvey for being gay, precipitating debate about gays in the military that results in the United States' "Don't ask, don't tell" military policy.
- 1993 – Widerøe Flight 744 crashes in Overhalla Municipality, Norway, killing six people.
- 1994 – Gliese 229B is the first Substellar Mass Object to be unquestionably identified.
- 1997 – The 1997 Asian financial crisis causes a crash in the Dow Jones Industrial Average.
- 1999 – Gunmen open fire in the Armenian Parliament, killing the Prime Minister and seven others.
- 2014 – Britain withdraws from Afghanistan at the end of Operation Herrick, after 12 years four months and seven days.
- 2017 – Catalonia declares independence from Spain.
- 2018 – A gunman opens fire on a Pittsburgh synagogue killing eleven and injuring six, including four police officers.
- 2018 – Leicester City F.C. owner Vichai Srivaddhanaprabha dies in a helicopter crash along with four others after a Premier League match against West Ham United at the King Power Stadium in Leicester, England.
- 2019 – Islamic State of Iraq and the Levant founder and leader Abu Bakr al-Baghdadi kills himself and three children by detonating a suicide vest during the U.S. military Barisha raid in northwestern Syria.

== Births ==
=== Pre-1600 ===
- 892 – Emperor Ai of Tang, Chinese emperor (died 908)
- 921 – Chai Rong, Chinese emperor (died 959)
- 1156 – Raymond VI, Count of Toulouse (died 1222)
- 1335 – Taejo of Joseon (died 1408)
- 1401 – Catherine of Valois, Queen consort of England (died 1437)
- 1561 – Mary Sidney, English writer, patroness and translator (died 1621)
- 1572 – Marie Elisabeth of France, French princess (died 1578)

=== 1601–1900 ===
- 1615 – Christian I, Duke of Saxe-Merseburg, (died 1691)
- 1661 – Fyodor Apraksin, Russian admiral (died 1728)
- 1703 – Johann Gottlieb Graun, German violinist and composer (died 1771)
- 1744 – Mary Moser, English painter and academic (died 1819)
- 1760 – August Neidhardt von Gneisenau, Prussian field marshal (died 1831)
- 1763 – William Maclure, Scottish-American Geologist (first geological map of USA) (died 1840)
- 1765 – Nancy Storace, English soprano (died 1817)
- 1782 – Niccolò Paganini, Italian violinist and composer (died 1840)
- 1806 – Juan Seguín, American colonel, judge, and politician, 101st Mayor of San Antonio (died 1890)
- 1811 – Stevens T. Mason, American lawyer and politician, 1st Governor of Michigan (died 1843)
- 1811 – Isaac Singer, American actor and businessman, founded the Singer Corporation (died 1875)
- 1814 – Daniel H. Wells, American religious leader and politician, 3rd Mayor of Salt Lake City (died 1891)
- 1838 – John Davis Long, American lawyer and politician, 34th United States Secretary of the Navy (died 1915)
- 1842 – Giovanni Giolitti, Italian politician, 13th Prime Minister of Italy (died 1928)
- 1844 – Klas Pontus Arnoldson, Swedish journalist and politician, Nobel Prize laureate (died 1916)
- 1854 – William Alexander Smith, Scottish religious leader, founded the Boys' Brigade (died 1914)
- 1858 – Elliott Lewis, Australian politician, 19th Premier of Tasmania (died 1935)
- 1858 – Saitō Makoto, Japanese admiral and politician, 30th Prime Minister of Japan (died 1936)
- 1858 – Theodore Roosevelt, American colonel and politician, 26th President of the United States, Nobel Prize laureate (died 1919)
- 1865 – Charles Spencelayh, English painter and academic (died 1958)
- 1868 – William Gillies, Australian politician, 21st Premier of Queensland (died 1928)
- 1872 – Emily Post, American authority on social behaviour and writer (died 1960)
- 1877 – Walt Kuhn, American painter and academic (died 1949)
- 1877 – George Thompson, English cricketer and umpire (died 1943)
- 1884 – Shirō Takasu, Japanese admiral (died 1944)
- 1885 – Sigrid Hjertén, Swedish painter (died 1948)
- 1890 – Toshinari Shōji, Japanese general (died 1974)
- 1894 – Agda Helin, Swedish actress (died 1984)
- 1894 – Oliver Leese, English-Welsh general (died 1978)
- 1894 – Fritz Sauckel, German sailor and politician, convicted Nuremberg war criminal (died 1946)
- 1894 – Ye Shengtao, Chinese writer, educator, and politician (died 1988)

=== 1901–present ===
- 1904 – Riho Lahi, Estonian journalist and author (died 1995)
- 1906 – Peter Blume, Belarusian-American painter and sculptor (died 1992)
- 1906 – Earle Cabell, American banker and politician, Mayor of Dallas (died 1975)
- 1906 – Kazuo Ohno, Japanese dancer and educator (died 2010)
- 1908 – Lee Krasner, American painter (died 1984)
- 1910 – Jack Carson, Canadian-American actor and singer (died 1963)
- 1910 – Fred de Cordova, American film and TV producer (Tonight Show) (died 2001)
- 1910 – Margaret Hutchinson Rousseau, American chemical engineer (died 2000)
- 1911 – Leif Erickson, American actor (died 1986)
- 1913 – Joe Medicine Crow, American anthropologist, historian, and author (died 2016)
- 1913 – Luigi Piotti, Italian race car driver (died 1971)
- 1914 – Ahmet Kireççi, Turkish wrestler (died 1979)
- 1914 – Dylan Thomas, Welsh poet and playwright (died 1953)
- 1915 – Harry Saltzman, Canadian-French production manager and producer (died 1994)
- 1917 – Augustine Harris, English bishop (died 2007)
- 1917 – Oliver Tambo, South African lawyer and politician (died 1993)
- 1918 – Mihkel Mathiesen, Estonian engineer and politician (died 2003)
- 1918 – Teresa Wright, American actress and singer (died 2005)
- 1920 – Nanette Fabray, American actress, singer, and dancer (died 2018)
- 1920 – K. R. Narayanan, Indian lawyer and politician, 10th President of India (died 2005)
- 1922 – Poul Bundgaard, Danish actor and singer (died 1998)
- 1922 – Ruby Dee, American actress and poet (died 2014)
- 1922 – Michel Galabru, French actor and playwright (died 2016)
- 1922 – Ralph Kiner, American baseball player and sportscaster (died 2014)
- 1923 – Roy Lichtenstein, American painter and sculptor (died 1997)
- 1923 – Ned Wertimer, American actor (died 2013)
- 1924 – Bonnie Lou, American singer-songwriter (died 2015)
- 1925 – Warren Christopher, American soldier, lawyer, and politician, 63rd United States Secretary of State (died 2011)
- 1925 – Jane Connell, American actress and singer (died 2013)
- 1925 – Paul Fox, English broadcaster (died 2024)
- 1925 – Monica Sims, English radio host and producer (died 2018)
- 1926 – Boris Chetkov, Russian painter (died 2010)
- 1926 – Henri Fertet, French Resistance fighter (died 1943)
- 1926 – H. R. Haldeman, American businessman and diplomat, 4th White House Chief of Staff (died 1993)
- 1926 – Takumi Shibano, Japanese author and translator (died 2010)
- 1927 – Dominick Argento, American composer and educator (died 2019)
- 1928 – Gilles Vigneault, Canadian singer-songwriter and poet
- 1929 – Myra Carter, American actress (died 2016)
- 1929 – Bill George, American football player (died 1982)
- 1929 – Maurice Robert Johnston, English general and politician, Lord Lieutenant of Wiltshire (died 2024)
- 1930 – Leo Baxendale, English cartoonist (died 2017)
- 1930 – Barry Supple, English historian and academic
- 1930 – Gladys West, American mathematician known for helping develop the GPS satellite system (died 2026)
- 1931 – Nawal El Saadawi, Egyptian physician, psychiatrist, and author (died 2021)
- 1931 – Anatoliy Zayaev, Ukrainian footballer and manager (died 2012)
- 1932 – Jean-Pierre Cassel, French actor (died 2007)
- 1932 – Harry Gregg, Northern Irish footballer and manager (died 2020)
- 1932 – Dolores Moore, American baseball player (died 2000)
- 1932 – Sylvia Plath, American poet, novelist, and short story writer (died 1963)
- 1933 – Floyd Cramer, American singer and pianist (died 1997)
- 1933 – Ryō Hanmura, Japanese author (died 2002)
- 1934 – Giorgos Konstantinou, Greek actor, director, and screenwriter
- 1935 – Maurício de Sousa, Brazilian journalist and cartoonist
- 1935 – Charlie Tagawa, Japanese-American banjo player and educator (died 2017)
- 1936 – Neil Sheehan, American journalist and author (died 2021)
- 1937 – Alma Powell, American audiologist (died 2024)
- 1938 – Lara Parker, American actress and author (died 2023)
- 1939 – John Cleese, English actor, comedian, screenwriter and producer
- 1939 – Suzy Covey, American scholar and academic (died 2007)
- 1939 – Dallas Frazier, American country music singer-songwriter (died 2022)
- 1940 – Arthur Blessitt, American Christian preacher (died 2025)
- 1940 – Julius Eastman, American composer (died 1990)
- 1940 – John Gotti, American mob boss (died 2002)
- 1940 – Maxine Hong Kingston, American author and academic
- 1941 – Dave Costa, American football player (died 2013)
- 1941 – Warren Ryan, Australian rugby league player, coach, and sportscaster
- 1941 – Dick Trickle, American race car driver (died 2013)
- 1942 – Lee Greenwood, American singer-songwriter
- 1942 – Janusz Korwin-Mikke, Polish journalist and politician
- 1943 – Carmen Argenziano, American actor and producer (died 2019)
- 1943 – Jerry Rook, American basketball player and coach (died 2019)
- 1944 – J. A. Jance, American author and poet
- 1945 – Arild Andersen, Norwegian bassist and composer
- 1945 – Luiz Inácio Lula da Silva, Brazilian union leader and politician, 35 and 39th President of Brazil
- 1945 – Carrie Snodgress, American actress (died 2004)
- 1946 – Peter Martins, Danish dancer and choreographer
- 1946 – Steven R. Nagel, American colonel, engineer, and astronaut (died 2014)
- 1946 – Ivan Reitman, Slovak-Canadian actor, director, and producer (died 2022)
- 1947 – Terry A. Anderson, American journalist (died 2024)
- 1948 – Kevin Borich, New Zealand-Australian guitarist and songwriter
- 1949 – Clifford Antone, founder of the Austin blues club Antone's and record label Antone's Records (died 2006)
- 1949 – Garry Tallent, American bass player and record producer
- 1950 – Michael Driscoll, English economist and academic
- 1950 – Fran Lebowitz, American author
- 1950 – Július Šupler, Slovak ice hockey player and coach
- 1950 – A. N. Wilson, English journalist, historian, and author
- 1951 – K. K. Downing, English guitarist and songwriter
- 1951 – Carlos Frenk, Mexican-English physicist, cosmologist, and academic
- 1951 – Nancy Jacobs, American politician
- 1951 – Jayne Kennedy, American model, actress, and sportscaster
- 1952 – Roberto Benigni, Italian actor, director, and screenwriter
- 1952 – Bill Bottrell, American Grammy Award-winning sound engineer, songwriter and record producer
- 1952 – Francis Fukuyama, American political scientist, economist, and author
- 1952 – Atsuyoshi Furuta, Japanese footballer
- 1952 – Topi Sorsakoski, Finnish singer-songwriter (died 2011)
- 1953 – Peter Firth, English actor
- 1953 – Robert Picardo, American actor, director, and screenwriter
- 1954 – Jan Duursema, American illustrator
- 1954 – Mike Kelley, American artist and musician (died 2012)
- 1954 – Chris Tavaré, English cricketer and biologist
- 1955 – Debra Bowen, American lawyer and politician, 31st Secretary of State of California
- 1956 – Patty Sheehan, American golfer
- 1956 – Babis Tsertos, Greek singer-songwriter and bouzouki player
- 1957 – Glenn Hoddle, English footballer and manager
- 1957 – Peter Marc Jacobson, American actor, director, and producer
- 1958 – Gordon Cowans, English footballer
- 1958 – David Hazeltine, American pianist and composer
- 1958 – Simon Le Bon, English singer-songwriter
- 1958 – Jonathan Shapiro, South African political cartoonist who uses the pseudonym Zapiro
- 1958 – Felix Wurman, American cellist and composer (died 2009)
- 1958 – Donnell Thompson, American football player (died 2024)
- 1959 – Rick Carlisle, American basketball player and coach
- 1960 – Tom Nieto, American baseball player, coach, and manager
- 1963 – David Hall, Australian horse trainer
- 1963 – Marla Maples, American model and actress
- 1963 – Tom McKean, Scottish runner
- 1964 – Mary T. Meagher, American swimmer
- 1964 – Mark Taylor, Australian cricketer and sportscaster
- 1964 – Ian Wells, English footballer (died 2013)
- 1965 – Mohan Kapoor, Indian television and film actor
- 1966 – Steve Almond, American author and educator
- 1966 – Matt Drudge, American political commentator and blogger (Drudge Report)
- 1966 – Kit Malthouse, English accountant and politician
- 1966 – Hege Nerland, Norwegian lawyer and politician (died 2007)
- 1966 – Masanobu Takashima, Japanese actor
- 1967 – Simone Moro, Italian mountaineer and pilot
- 1967 – Dejan Raičković, Montenegrin footballer and manager
- 1967 – Scott Weiland, American singer-songwriter (died 2015)
- 1968 – Alain Auderset, Swiss author and illustrator
- 1968 – Dileep, Indian actor and producer
- 1968 – Vinny Samways, English footballer and manager
- 1969 – Marek Napiórkowski, Polish jazz guitarist and composer
- 1969 – Michael Tarnat, German footballer
- 1970 – Karl Backman, Swedish guitarist and songwriter
- 1970 – Felix Bwalya, Zambian boxer (died 1997)
- 1970 – Adrian Erlandsson, Swedish drummer
- 1970 – Jonathan Stroud, English author
- 1970 – Ruslana Taran, Ukrainian sailor
- 1971 – Stefano Guidoni, Italian footballer
- 1971 – Jorge Soto, Peruvian footballer
- 1971 – Theodoros Zagorakis, Greek footballer and politician
- 1972 – Lee Clark, English footballer and manager
- 1972 – Elissa, Lebanese singer
- 1972 – Evan Coyne Maloney, American director, producer, and screenwriter
- 1972 – Maria Mutola, Mozambican runner and coach
- 1972 – Brad Radke, American baseball player
- 1973 – Anthony Doerr, American writer (All the Light We Cannot See - Pulitzer Prize for Fiction 2015)
- 1973 – Jason Johnson, American baseball player
- 1973 – Semmy Schilt, Dutch kick-boxer and mixed martial artist
- 1975 – Predrag Drobnjak, Montenegrin basketball player
- 1975 – Nicola Mazzucato, Italian rugby player and coach
- 1975 – Aron Ralston, American mountaineer and engineer
- 1976 – Bobby Fish, American professional wrestler
- 1976 – Maneet Chauhan, Indian-American chef and author
- 1976 – Wilson Júnior, Brazilian footballer
- 1977 – Jiří Jarošík, Czech footballer
- 1977 – Sheeri Rappaport, American actress
- 1977 – Kumar Sangakkara, Sri Lankan cricketer
- 1978 – Sergei Samsonov, Russian ice hockey player and scout
- 1978 – Vanessa-Mae, Singaporean-English violinist and skier
- 1979 – Hiroyuki Yamamoto, Japanese footballer
- 1980 – Sayuri Osuga, Japanese speed skater and cyclist
- 1980 – Tanel Padar, Estonian singer-songwriter and guitarist
- 1980 – Henriett Seth F., Hungarian autistic savant artist and author
- 1981 – Salem Al Fakir, Swedish singer and keyboard player
- 1981 – Sririta Jensen, Thai actress and model
- 1981 – Volkan Demirel, Turkish footballer
- 1981 – Kristi Richards, Canadian skier
- 1982 – Patrick Fugit, American actor and producer
- 1982 – Takashi Tsukamoto, Japanese actor and singer
- 1983 – Brent Clevlen, American baseball player
- 1983 – Martín Prado, Venezuelan baseball player
- 1984 – Yi Jianlian, Chinese basketball player
- 1984 – Kostas Kapetanos, Greek footballer
- 1984 – Kelly Osbourne, English television personality
- 1984 – Brady Quinn, American football player
- 1984 – Emilie Ullerup, Danish-Canadian actress
- 1985 – Sirli Hanni, Estonian biathlete
- 1985 – Alex Soros, American investor and philanthropist
- 1986 – Chris Butler, American ice hockey player
- 1986 – Anna Cruz, Spanish basketball player
- 1986 – Christine Evangelista, American actress
- 1986 – Crystal Langhorne, American basketball player
- 1986 – Jon Niese, American baseball player
- 1986 – Matty Pattison, South African-English footballer
- 1986 – David Warner, Australian cricketer
- 1986 – Lou Williams, American basketball player
- 1987 – Thelma Aoyama, Japanese singer
- 1987 – Björn Barrefors, Swedish decathlete and heptathlete
- 1987 – Andrew Bynum, American basketball player
- 1987 – Guillaume Franke, French-German rugby player
- 1988 – Brady Ellison, American archer
- 1988 – Viktor Genev, Bulgarian footballer
- 1988 – Illimar Pärn, Estonian ski jumper
- 1988 – Evan Turner, American basketball player
- 1989 – Mark Barron, American football player
- 1990 – Alex Bentley, American-Belarusian basketball player
- 1990 – Dimitrios Gkourtsas, Greek footballer
- 1990 – Oktovianus Maniani, Indonesian footballer
- 1991 – Shohei Takahashi, Japanese footballer
- 1992 – Stephan El Shaarawy, Italian footballer
- 1992 – Emily Hagins, American director, producer, and screenwriter
- 1992 – Brandon Saad, American ice hockey player
- 1992 – Daniel Sams, Australian cricketer
- 1993 – Troy Gentile, American actor
- 1993 – Kiefer Ravena, Filipino basketball player
- 1994 – Rasmus Ristolainen, Finnish ice hockey player
- 1995 – Leon Draisaitl, German ice hockey player
- 1996 – Rasmus Andersson, Swedish ice hockey player
- 1996 – Kim Woo-seok, South Korean singer and actor
- 1997 – Lonzo Ball, American basketball player
- 1997 – James TW, English singer-songwriter
- 1999 – Haruka Kudo, Japanese singer and actress

== Deaths ==
=== Pre-1600 ===
- 939 – Æthelstan, English king
- 1052 – Qirwash ibn al-Muqallad, Uqaylid emir
- 1269 – Ulrich III, Duke of Carinthia (born c.1220)
- 1272 – Hugh IV, Duke of Burgundy (born 1213)
- 1277 – Walter de Merton, Lord Chancellor of England
- 1303 – Beatrice of Castile, wife of King Afonso III of Portugal
- 1312 – John II, Duke of Brabant (born 1275)
- 1326 – Hugh le Despenser, 1st Earl of Winchester (born 1262)
- 1327 – Elizabeth de Burgh, queen of Robert the Bruce
- 1329 – Mahaut, Countess of Artois (born 1268)
- 1331 – Abulfeda, Arab historian and geographer (born 1273)
- 1430 – Vytautas, Lithuanian ruler (born 1350)
- 1439 – Albert II of Germany (born 1397)
- 1441 – Margery Jourdemayne, executed for treasonable witchcraft
- 1449 – Ulugh Beg, Persian astronomer, mathematician and sultan (born 1394)
- 1485 – Rodolphus Agricola, Dutch philosopher, poet and educator (born 1443)
- 1505 – Ivan III of Russia (born 1440)
- 1513 – George Manners, 11th Baron de Ros, English nobleman
- 1553 – Michael Servetus, Spanish physician and theologian (born 1511)
- 1561 – Lope de Aguirre, Spanish explorer (born 1510)
- 1573 – Laurentius Petri, Swedish archbishop (born 1499)

=== 1601–1900 ===
- 1605 – Akbar, Mughal emperor (born 1542)
- 1613 – Gabriel Báthory, Prince of Transylvania (born 1589)
- 1617 – Ralph Winwood, English lawyer and politician, English Secretary of State (born 1563)
- 1666 – Robert Hubert, French watchmaker (born 1640)
- 1670 – Vavasor Powell, Welsh minister (born 1617)
- 1674 – Hallgrímur Pétursson, Icelandic minister and poet (born 1614)
- 1675 – Gilles de Roberval, French mathematician and academic (born 1602)
- 1789 – John Cook, American farmer and politician, 6th Governor of Delaware (born 1730)
- 1812 – Isaac Brock, British army officer and administrator, Lieutenant Governor of Upper Canada (born 1769)
- 1816 – Santō Kyōden, Japanese poet and painter (born 1761)
- 1880 – Thrasyvoulos Zaimis, Greek soldier and politician, 48th Prime Minister of Greece (born 1822)

=== 1901–present ===
- 1917 – Arthur Rhys-Davids, English lieutenant and pilot (born 1897)
- 1926 – Warren Wood, American golfer and soldier (born 1887)
- 1927 – Squizzy Taylor, Australian gangster (born 1888)
- 1929 – Théodore Tuffier, French surgeon (born 1857)
- 1930 – Ellen Hayes, American mathematician and astronomer (born 1851)
- 1935 – Ernest Eldridge, English race car driver (born 1897)
- 1942 – Helmuth Hübener, German activist (born 1925)
- 1944 – Judith Auer, German World War II resistance fighter (born 1905)
- 1947 – William Fay, Irish actor and producer, co-founded the Abbey Theatre (born 1872)
- 1949 – Marcel Cerdan, Algerian-French boxer (born 1916)
- 1953 – Thomas Wass, English cricketer (born 1873)
- 1957 – James McGirr, Australian politician, 28th Premier of New South Wales (born 1890)
- 1962 – Rudolf Anderson, American soldier and pilot (born 1927)
- 1962 – Enrico Mattei, Italian businessman and politician (born 1906)
- 1968 – Lise Meitner, Austrian-English physicist and academic (born 1878)
- 1974 – C. P. Ramanujam, Indian mathematician and academic (born 1938)
- 1975 – Rex Stout, American detective novelist (born 1886)
- 1977 – James M. Cain, American journalist and author (born 1892)
- 1980 – Judy LaMarsh, Canadian soldier, lawyer, and politician, 42nd Secretary of State for Canada (born 1924)
- 1980 – John Hasbrouck Van Vleck, American physicist and mathematician, Nobel Prize laureate (born 1899)
- 1982 – Miguel Ydígoras Fuentes, President of Guatemala (1958–1963) (born 1895)
- 1988 – Charles Hawtrey, English actor, singer, and pianist (born 1914)
- 1990 – Xavier Cugat, Spanish-American violinist, bandleader, and actor (born 1900)
- 1990 – Jacques Demy, French actor, singer, director, and screenwriter (born 1931)
- 1990 – Elliott Roosevelt, American general and author (born 1910)
- 1990 – Ugo Tognazzi, Italian actor, director, and screenwriter (born 1922)
- 1991 – George Barker, English author and poet (born 1913)
- 1992 – David Bohm, American-English physicist and philosopher (born 1917)
- 1992 – Allen R. Schindler, Jr. American sailor (born 1969)
- 1996 – Arthur Tremblay, Canadian lawyer and politician (born 1917)
- 1997 – Mahala Andrews, British vertebrae palaeontologist (born 1939)
- 1999 – Robert Mills, American physicist and academic (born 1927)
- 1999 – Charlotte Perriand, French architect and designer (born 1903)
- 2000 – Walter Berry, Austrian lyric bass-baritone (born 1929)
- 2001 – Pradeep Kumar, Indian actor, director, and producer (born 1925)
- 2002 – Tom Dowd, American record producer and engineer (born 1925)
- 2002 – Valve Pormeister, Estonian architect (born 1922)
- 2003 – Rod Roddy, American game show announcer (born 1937)
- 2003 – Stephanie Tyrell, American songwriter and producer (born 1949)
- 2004 – Lester Lanin, American bandleader (born 1907)
- 2004 – Paulo Sérgio Oliveira da Silva, Brazilian footballer (born 1974)
- 2004 – Zdenko Runjić, Croatian songwriter and producer (born 1942)
- 2005 – Jerry Cooke, Ukrainian-American photographer and journalist (born 1921)
- 2006 – Jozsef Gregor, Hungarian opera singer (born 1940)
- 2006 – Reko Lundán, Finnish journalist and author (born 1969)
- 2006 – Marlin McKeever, American football player (born 1940)
- 2006 – Joe Niekro, American baseball player (born 1944)
- 2006 – Brad Will, American journalist and activist (born 1970)
- 2007 – Moira Lister, South African actress (born 1923)
- 2008 – Chris Bryant, English actor and screenwriter (born 1936)
- 2008 – Ray Ellis, American conductor and producer (born 1923)
- 2008 – Frank Nagai, Japanese singer (born 1932)
- 2008 – Roy Stewart, Jamaican-English actor and stuntman (born 1925)
- 2009 – John David Carson, American actor (born 1952)
- 2009 – August Coppola, American author and academic (born 1934)
- 2009 – David Shepherd, English cricketer and umpire (born 1940)
- 2009 – Taylor Mitchell, Canadian singer and songwriter (born 1990)
- 2010 – Néstor Kirchner, Argentinian lawyer and politician, 51st President of Argentina (born 1950)
- 2011 – James Hillman, American psychologist and author (born 1926)
- 2011 – Robert Pritzker, American businessman, co-founded Marmon Group (born 1926)
- 2012 – Terry Callier, American singer-songwriter and guitarist (born 1945)
- 2012 – Angelo Maria Cicolani, Italian engineer and politician (born 1952)
- 2012 – Regina Dourado, Brazilian actress (born 1952)
- 2012 – Hans Werner Henze, German composer and educator (born 1926)
- 2012 – Rodney S. Quinn, American colonel, pilot, and politician, 44th Secretary of State of Maine (born 1923)
- 2012 – Göran Stangertz, Swedish actor and director (born 1944)
- 2013 – Noel Davern, Irish lawyer and politician, Minister for Education and Skills (born 1945)
- 2013 – Leonard Herzenberg, American immunologist, geneticist, and academic (born 1931)
- 2013 – Luigi Magni, Italian director and screenwriter (born 1928)
- 2013 – Lou Reed, American singer-songwriter, guitarist, producer, and actor (born 1942)
- 2013 – Michael Wilkes, English general and politician, Lieutenant Governor of Jersey (born 1940)
- 2013 – Vinko Coce, Croatian opera and pop singer (born 1954)
- 2014 – Daniel Boulanger, French actor and screenwriter (born 1922)
- 2014 – Shin Hae-chul, South Korean singer-songwriter and producer (born 1968)
- 2014 – Starke Taylor, American soldier and politician, mayor of Dallas (born 1922)
- 2015 – Ayerdhal, French author (born 1959)
- 2015 – Ranjit Roy Chaudhury, Indian pharmacologist and academic (born 1930)
- 2015 – Betsy Drake, French-American actress and singer (born 1923)
- 2015 – Philip French, English journalist, critic, and producer (born 1933)
- 2016 – Takahito, Prince Mikasa, member of the Imperial Family of Japan (born 1915)
- 2018 – Vichai Srivaddhanaprabha, Thai businessman, chairman of Leicester City F.C. (born 1958)
- 2019 – Abu Bakr al-Baghdadi, leader of the Islamic State of Iraq and the Levant (ISIL); suicide (born 1971)
- 2023 – Li Keqiang, premier of China (born 1955)
- 2025 – Prunella Scales, English actress (born 1932)

== Holidays and observances ==
- Christian feast day:
  - Abbán
  - Abraham the Poor
  - Gaudiosus of Naples
  - Kaleb of Axum
  - Namatius (Namace)
  - Oran of Iona
  - Thraseas
  - October 27 (Eastern Orthodox liturgics)
- Černová Tragedy Day (Slovakia)
- Flag Day (Greece)
- Independence Day (Saint Vincent and the Grenadines), celebrates the independence of Saint Vincent and the Grenadines from United Kingdom in 1979.
- International Religious Freedom Day (United States)
- National Black Cat Day (United Kingdom)
- Navy Day (United States) (unofficial, official date is October 13)
- World Day for Audiovisual Heritage
