= Oscar Wilson =

Oscar Wilson may refer to:

- Oscar Wilson (artist) (1867–1930), English painter and illustrator
- Red Wilson (musician) or Oscar O. Wilson (1920–2005), American musician and fiddle-maker
