= Curtis Yorke =

Scottish writer (1854–1930

- Born: Susan Rowley Long; 1854; Scotland
- Died: 1930 (aged 75–76)
- Occupation: Writer
- Spouse: John Wilson Richmond Lee

Curtis Yorke, the pen name of Susan Rowley Richmond Lee (1854–1930), was a Scottish writer.

== Early life and marriage ==
The daughter of John Jex Long, she was born Susan Rowley Long in Scotland and was educated in Glasgow. She married John Wilson Richmond Lee, a mining engineer. The couple moved to Kensington in London.

== Career ==
She published her first novel That Little Girl in 1886 and went on to publish almost fifty titles.

=== Selected works ===
- That Little Girl (1886)
- Hush!: A Novel (1888), three volumes, published by Richard Bentley
- Dudley. A Story of Modern Life (1888), published by Jarrold & Sons
- The Wild Ruthvens: A Home Story (1889), published by Jarrold & Sons
- The Mystery of Belgrave Square (1889), published by F. V. White
- A Romance of Modern London: A Novel (1892), three volumes, published by F. V. White
- His Heart to Win (1893), published by Jarrold & Sons
- Between the Silences and Other Stories (1894), published by Jarrold & Sons
- The Medlicotts: An Uneventful Family Chronicle (1895), published by Jarrold & Sons
- Because of the Child: A Story without a Plot (1897), published by Jarrold & Sons
- A Flirtation with Truth (1897), published by John Macqueen
- Those Children (illustrated by Hal Hurst, 1899)
- Carpathia Knox: A Novel (1900), published by Jarrold & Sons
- Only Betty (1907), published by John Long
- All about Judy (1927)

== See also ==
- List of people from Glasgow
- List of people from the Royal Borough of Kensington and Chelsea
- List of Scottish novelists
- List of women writers
