= Elsie Maud White =

New Zealand miniaturist

- Born: Elsie Maud Boyd; 1889; Rangiora
- Died: 1978 (aged 88–89); Christchurch, New Zealand
- Spouse: Robert Oscar White
- Awards: First Diploma at the New Zealand Centennial Exhibition

Elsie Maud White (née Boyd, 1889 – 1978) was a New Zealand artist who was well known for her miniature portraits. She was the first New Zealander to be elected to the Society of Miniaturists and had the first New Zealand miniature exhibited by the Royal Academy.

== Biography ==
Elise Maud White was born in 1889 in Rangiora, the daughter of Thomas Boyd. She married Robert Oscar White in 1914. They had three sons, one of whom studied at the Auckland School of Art.

She was largely self-taught, but also trained under Samuel Moreton. In 1939, she was elected to the Society of Miniaturists, the first New Zealander to achieve this. She was also awarded had a First Diploma at the New Zealand Centennial Exhibition in 1940. In 1944, she set up a studio in Timaru and then she moved it to Christchurch in 1945. Her obituary describes the years following World War II as her most productive years.

She died in Christchurch in September 1978.

== Works ==
White was primarily known for her miniature portraits, which were often painted on ivory and framed in gold. She was commissioned to produce several portraits including the Queen Mother, Lady Olive Newall, wife of Sir Cyril Newall, and Dame Sybil Thorndike. Her obituary noted that the Robert McDougall Art Gallery, now the Christchurch Art Gallery Te Puna o Waiwhetū, has a collection of 12 of her works.

In 1939, three of White's miniatures were exhibited in London, at the Royal Institute Galleries, and an additional miniature, entitled "Kobin," the portrait of a great-grandson of Sir Henry Brett, and her great-nephew was submitted to the Royal Academy. In 1955, her miniature called "Miranda" of the three-year-old daughter of Mr J. R. B. Menzies, of Christchurch, was the first time a miniature painted by a New Zealander has been exhibited by the Royal Academy.

White was described as painting between 50 and 60 miniatures a year from 1935 to 1955.

She also exhibited at the New York Society of Miniature Painters, Canterbury Society of Arts (1942, 1945, 1946, 1947, 1948, 1951, 1956, 1958), New Zealand Academy of Fine Arts (1951), and Australian Art Societies.
