= Nellie Hepburn-Edmunds =

British painter

Nellie Mary Hepburn-Edmunds (1879 - 14 February 1953) was a British painter of portrait miniatures.

== Biography ==
Hepburn-Edmunds attended the Slade School of Fine Art in London and the Westminster School of Art, studying under William Mouat Loudan. She was a member of the council of the Royal Society of Miniature Painters, and served as the Vice-President of the society from 1912.

Her work was exhibited at the Salon des Artistes Français in Paris in 1931, and at the Royal Academy for 45 years after her work was first accepted while she was at the Slade School. One of her miniatures is on permanent exhibition at the Victoria and Albert Museum in London, and her Christopher Edward Clive Hussey (1899-1970) aged 9 is in the National Trust's collection at Scotney Castle.
