= Henry Saxon =

English painter (1918–2005)

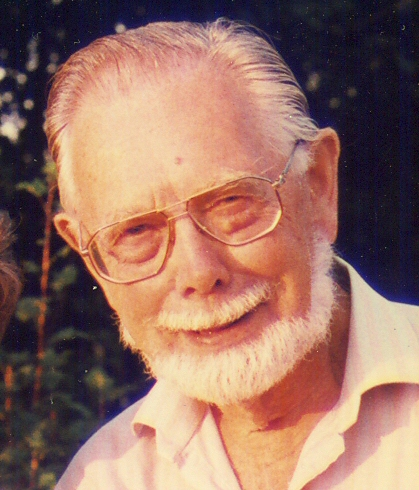
- Born: Henry Saxon; 16 August 1918; Lancashire, England
- Died: 3 October 2005 (aged 87); England
- Education: Manchester School of Art
- Known for: Painter
- Movement: Miniatures
- Awards: Gold Memorial Bowl

Henry Saxon (16 August 1918 – 3 October 2005) was an artist specialising in miniatures. His paintings typically comprised verse or biblical text set in fine borders with one or more inset illustrative pictures.

== History ==
Henry Saxon was born in Ashton-under-Lyne in 1918 and as he grew up his grandfather encouraged him to follow his artistic talent. At the age of fourteen he joined the Manchester School of Art and studied art and, in particular, calligraphy.

At 21, Henry joined the Army Medical Corps, married at 23 and lived in Africa until the end of the World War II. He then returned to England to join his wife Agnes. In 1940 he produced most of the 67 illustrations for a medical text on radiography: 'The Handbook of Radiography' by John A. Ross MA(Camb), MRSC (Eng), LRCP (Lond), DMRE (L'pool). Published by HK Lewis & Co London, 1940.

After the war his only child Moira was born and he returned to work in the printing industry where he was introduced to John Spencer, Hon. RMS, who introduced him to miniature art and his niche specialty of miniature illuminated calligraphy started.

In 1985 he was elected to Associate Membership of the Royal Miniature Society after a number of years exhibiting with them and also helping with the production of their magazine. Two years later he was awarded the prestigious Gold Memorial Bowl. He has also won the Gordon Drummond and the Fairman members subject miniature awards, is a founder member of the Hilliard society of miniaturists and was elected as a Signature member of the Miniature Artists of America winning awards in Georgia and Florida.

== Paintings ==
Through his life, Henry produced many hundreds of miniatures. The calligraphy is typically exquisite, normally of poems or passages of scripture and beautifully set.

The work starts with the draft text using a fine lead pencil, sanded to an even sharper point. Then with specially adapted pens, ground down by hand to produce a fine tip the text is completed and any gold leaf brushed onto the required sections. Then the borders and any paintings are incorporated.

=== Candle in the Wind ===
This illuminated script of a song, Candle in the Wind, written and popularized by Elton John. It was painted after the Funeral of Diana, Princess of Wales in 1997 at which the song was sung by its composer. It features a classically illuminated first letter with a gold border and scroll text title. Heraldic roses, approximately 18, decorate and tumble around the relatively 'large' illuminated and highly decorative initial letter G; note the white burning candle in the centre of the G. A very fine line border in gold leaf, decorative at two of the corners, surrounds the whole illumination and text.

=== Magnificat ===
A totally unique oval miniature of the head of the Virgin Mary with a gold crown; there is an extravagant use of gold leaf for the crown. This miniature is painted in an icon style. Henry is conveying his own beliefs through this miniature. The amazing feature is the background, which looks alive, without solid colour but shimmering (Henry's background in printing would have helped him with the intricate Pointillism). This is a moment of cosmic significance, as the Virgin Mary accepts the task of bearing the Son of God. He achieved this through complex colour and use of dark and light. Scrolled wording of Mary's words: "My soul magnifies the Lord" is at the base of the miniature. Henry constantly looked for new ways of expression to enhance the calligraphy text he chose, and this is an unusual and strong demonstration of this trait.

=== A Good Wife and Mother ===
An oval miniature with biblical text from Proverbs Chapter 32, a border of scrollwork in autumnal colours growing in intensity to the base of the oval. Classic simplicity.

=== Silver by Walter De La Mare ===
The very delicate illustration, title and initial letters of each verse are in blue on a white background. The title is set in the top border which includes objects which are hinted at, you have to delve into this miniature and explore it to discover these. This miniature was placed in an exhibition of miniatures by seventeen contemporary miniaturist at the Medici Galleries in Grafton Street, Bond Street, London in 1985. This is the only miniature by Henry that has been printed and reproduced.

=== Thou Who wast Rich Beyond all Splendour ===
Three verses of a hymn by Bishop Frank Houghton (1894–1972) describing the mystery of the Incarnation of Christ. The two small miniature illustrations depict the splendour of the Godhead at the top and the lowly nativity scene at the bottom. The border is in a rich blue with scroll work of gold leaf draws attention to the reference of 'saphire-paved courts'. The nativity has similarities to one within a group of pictures from an English manuscript "Psalter: ms. Arundel 83, British Museum Six scenes from the childhood of Christ, folio 124 R." of the 14th century at the British Museum, A plate of which is within Treasures of Illumination English Manuscripts of the Fourteenth Century (c1250 to 1400) described by The Rev. Canon F. Harrison, MA, FSA Chancellor and Librarian of York Minster. (1937) London: The studio Ltd. New York: The Studio Publications Inc.

=== To the Cuckoo by William Wordsworth ===
Amazing and very details scroll work on the border surrounding the 7 verses, the lettering and calligraphy is very small. 8 small miniatures each surrounded by a border of gold-leaf are present, 5 different shapes have been used for these. 5 of these small miniatures have burst of light with a bird which gives a sense of movement and flight. The slightly larger miniature of a cuckoo at the top centre also incorporates boughs and leaves of a tree. There are two small portraits within each side of the border one a school boy and the other a more mature man reflecting, both of these illustrate the wording within the poem. This miniature is painted in predominantly blue but also with green.

=== Prayer of Dedication ===
Two borders surround the text from Ignatius Loyola (1491). The outer border a fine line of gold-leaf. The inner border is also outlined with gold leaf and is totally filled with scroll work of reds and pinks changing through to purples and to blues, the main swathes are in green. The top and right section of the border are narrow compared to the bottom border and the left border which has yet a further increase. A small raised square miniature framed by curved gold leaf is on the top left corner of the border; it depicts the head of Christ at the crucifixion. The background to this small miniature of Christ's death can be compared to that of the miniature of the Magnificat the response to announcement of Christ's conception, and of both it could be said: "The amazing feature is the background, which looks alive, without solid colour but shimmering. This is a moment of cosmic significance." The contrasts between the two backgrounds are in the colouring: the announcement of the conception is full of colour but the crucifixion is in solely brown tones. This miniature displays calligraphy which is comparatively large for Henry, showing it probably was a miniature painted after his stroke, Henry displayed a strong determination to overcome his disability and continue with his fine miniature art work.

=== The Shepherd Boy Sings in the Valley of Humiliation ===
This miniature is a consideration of the difference between contentment and the burden of much with text by John Bunyan. One wonders why such an ornate illumination with much use of gold leaf has been chosen. There is gold leaf on the pinnacles, borders, and in the scroll work, it is also on the border around the small raised miniature painting of the humble shepherd boy. Perhaps it is all to create a great contrast between the simplicity of the shepherd boy with "here little" and the richness in gold illustrating the "hereafter bliss". A detailed description of the sequence of producing this miniature is found in The Techniques of Painting Miniatures. This miniature was exhibited as part of the 2nd World Miniature Exhibition in Hobart Tasmania in the year 2000.

Note on Piano Key Miniatures
An old piano was left outside a house in Harrow, ready for refuse. The keys were examined and found to be ivory. Henry sought permission to keep the unworn and unchipped keys. Most of the piano key sized miniatures he crafted were on ivory from this source.

=== Pitstone Mills ===
A Windmill with brick factory chimneys in the background (now demolished). Sense of power of the wind depicted in the clouds and the contrast of the golden calm of harvest gathered in. (Piano key)

=== The Lord is my Shephard ===
Two miniatures were painted of this text on piano keys for his first wife Agnes, one with a predominance of reds and the other with blues. Exceptional detail on a very small 'canvas'. (Piano key)

=== Loves Eternal Knot ===
A red background, the colour of love, which has edging at times straight and at other points intricately curved. The short text is presented on 2 scrolls but the centrepiece is an unending knot presented in gold leaf. (Piano key)

=== The Lord Bless and Keep Thee ===
Surrounding this blessing a large amount of gold leaf is used on the border. The top border uses features which convey cathedral or church arches and pinnacles, (this was developed and also used in the miniature 'The Shepherd Boy Sings'): this feature is portrayed in early illuminations in The Saint-Omer Hours 1350 British Library London Add. ms.36684 Books of Hours and Their Owners, John Hartman Thames and Hudson 1997 Adoration of the Magi. On this upright oblong piano key the heavenly blessing depicted by gold cathedral pinnacles plus a starry sky is seen to be transferred and descending to the bottom of the miniature with the word 'THEE'. (Piano key)

=== Treasure ===
This picture features on the cover of The Magic of Miniatures with Psalm 121 and "A Poem" by Cecil Spring-Rice inside.

== Miniatures without Illumination or Calligraphy ==
=== Swiss Alps above Wengen ===
A line drawing of a Swiss chalet, path and tree within the alps. A wash of walnut was applied to the Bristol board. Touches of white can be seen on the mountains.
