= May de Montravel Edwardes =

English artist (1887-1967)

- Born: 1887; London
- Died: 10 December 1964; London
- Known for: Painting

May de Montravel Edwardes (1887 – 10 December 1964) was a British painter and miniaturist.

== Biography ==
Edwardes was born in London and studied at the Cope and Nichol School of Art in South Kensington before entering the Royal Academy Schools. Edwardes was at the Royal Academy Schools from 1907 to 1912 during which time she won both bronze and silver medals for her work.

During her career she exhibited at the Royal Academy, with the Royal Institute of Oil Painters and was a member of the Royal Miniature Society. Edwardes exhibited at the Salon des Artistes Francais in Paris from 1926 and also had a solo show at the Brook Street Gallery in London. For most of her life, Edwardes lived in London.
