= Henry Harding Bingley =

English painter

- Born: 1887; Middlesex, London, England
- Died: 1972 (aged 84–85); Worthing, Sussex, England
- Occupation: Artist
- Years active: 1912–1971

Henry Harding Bingley (1887–1972) was an English painter in washed oils and watercolour.

== Life ==
Bingley was born in London but spent many years of his life in Perranporth, Cornwall working as an artist. During his working life he was an Associated Member of the British Watercolour Society (BWS), a member of the Royal Miniature Society (RMS) and a member of the Society of Miniaturists (SM).

== Paintings ==
There is evidence of an extensive catalogue of his work. His paintings almost always include water and he is best known for watercolours of Cornish coastal scenes. However, there are pictures in existence that portray Devon, Wales, Scotland, Cumbria, Yorkshire, Dorset and London. He signed his paintings as H.H. Bingley in the earlier years as script and later in uppercase.

== Misnomer ==
Bingley's given name was once incorrectly thought to be Herbert. This was quashed after further research.
