= Catherine Mary MacSorley =

- Born: 5 October 1848; Dublin, Ireland
- Died: 26 January 1929 (aged 80); Dublin, Ireland
- Occupation: Writer
- Writing career
- Language: English
- Period: Victorian era Edwardian era

Catherine Mary MacSorley (5 October 1848 – 26 January 1929) was an Irish writer. She specialized in books for girls and books of a religious nature.

She was born at 94 Ranelagh Road, Dublin, eldest daughter of Catherine and Rev. John James MacSorley (1809-1884), rector of St. Peter's Church, Aungier St., Dublin. The family afterwards moved to Harcourt Terrace, where, after the death of her mother in 1910, she lived with her sister Mary Gertrude for the rest of their lives. Many of her books were published by the Society for Promoting Christian Knowledge (SPCK).

She wrote the hymn, "We thank Thee, O our Father" ("Praise to God"), in 1890 for the children of Saint Peter’s School in nearby Camden Row.

She died in Dublin in 1929 and was interred in Mount Jerome Cemetery.

== Select works ==
- The Earl-Printer: A Tale of the Time of Caxton (J.F. Shaw & Co., 1877)
- His Chosen Work; or, Was it a Failure? (J.F. Shaw & Co., 1884)
- Number One, Brighton Street: Or When We Assemble And Meet Together (SPCK, 1885)
- A Few Good Women, and What They Teach Us. A Book for Girls (J. Hogg, 1886)
- Exiled; or When Great Grandmother Was Young (J. Hogg, 1889)
- A Dull Life (SPCK, 1892)
- After Many Days (SPCK, 1892)
- The Old House (SPCK, 1893)
- A Steep Road (SPCK, 1894)
- Aunt Dorothy's Tea-Table etc. (SPCK, 1896)
- A Seaside Story (SPCK, 1897) - illustrated by W. H. Overend
- The Dog at Number Twelve (SPCK, 1898)
- Rosie's Friend (SPCK, 1899)
- The Children's Plan and What Came of it etc. (SPCK, 1899)
- The Vicarage Children (SPCK, 1900)
- The Vicar's Dreams. A Christmas Story (Religious Tract Society, nd)
- An Irish Cousin (SPCK, 1901)
- How the Story Ended (SPCK, 1902)
- Good-bye, Summer. A Story for Girls (SPCK, 1906)
- Nora; an Irish Story (SPCK, 1908) - illustrated by Oscar Wilson
- The Rectory Family (SPCK, 1910)
- Harold's Mother; or the Bugle Call (SPCK, 1914)
- Ireland and her Church: A Simple History for Children (SPCK, 1915) - also The Island of Saints
- The Story of our Parish - St. Peter's, Dublin (Corrigan & Wilson, 1917)
- The Road Through the Bog (SPCK, 1918)

== See also ==
- List of Irish writers
