= G. C. Williamson =

British art historian and antiquarian

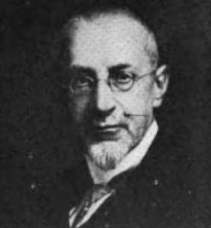
- Williamson in 1917
- Born: George Charles Williamson; 1858; Guildford, England
- Died: September 1942 (aged 84); Guildford, England
- Other name: Rowley Cleeve
- Education: University of London
- Occupations: Historian, writer
- Spouse: Louisa Mary Lethbridge (m. 1883)

George Charles Williamson (1858–1942) was a British art historian, antiquarian, and author of numerous books on European art and artists. He sometimes wrote under the pen name Rowley Cleeve.

== Biography ==
G. C. Williamson was born in Guildford in 1858, and was educated at the University of London. He married Louisa Mary Lethbridge in 1883.

He wrote many books on European art and artists, focusing on the period from the Renaissance to the late 19th century. A number of these were issued as volumes in the publisher George Bell & Sons' Miniature Series of Painters, of which he was also the series editor. He wrote some of these under his real name and some under his "Rowley Cleeve" pseudonym.

In the years 1899-1914 he was the series editor of the book series Great Masters in Painting and Sculpture (George Bell & Sons).

He also wrote guides for art collectors on various topics—including several on portrait miniatures—and he assembled catalogues for collectors of art and antiques. For the American banker J. Pierpont Morgan, he put together a four-volume catalogue of Morgan's collection of miniatures; a fifth volume was never completed due to Morgan's death. Williamson also served as an adviser to Morgan on some purchases for his collection.

Williamson occasionally wrote on literary, historical, and cultural topics outside the field of art. Among these are Curious Survivals, a book on English customs, and a book on the voyages of the Elizabethan naval commander George Clifford, 3rd Earl of Cumberland.

Among Williamson' coauthored books is a study of the painter Angelica Kauffmann, one of the founding members of the Royal Academy of Arts (RA). Angelica Kauffmann, R.A.: Her Life and Her Works, written with Lady Victoria Manners, was prompted by the discovery in the RA archives of a manuscript in Kauffmann's handwriting, written in Italian and previously untranslated, which gives an account of Kauffmann's paintings post-1781. Manners and Williamson wrote that this enabled them to "come to certain definite conclusions regarding many pictures hitherto ascribed to other artists." They included numerous reproductions in both colour and black-and-white on the grounds that prior books on Kauffman had presented inadequate reproductions of her paintings.

He died at his home in Guildford in September 1942.

A few of Williamson's papers from the period 1921–1937 are held by Boston College.

== Publications ==
=== Solo authored ===
- John Russell, R.A. (1893) (See also John Russell.)
- The Money of the Bible (1894)
- Portrait Miniatures from the Time of Holbein 1531 to That of Sir William Ross 1860: A Handbook for Collectors (1897)
- Bernardino Luini (1899)
- George J. Pinwell and His Works (1900)
- Francesco Raibolini Called Francia (1901)
- Fra Angelico (1901)
- Frederic, Lord Leighton (1902)
- Murillo (1902)
- Pietro Vannucci Called Perugino (1903)
- Holman Hunt (1903)
- Velazquez (1904)
- The History of Portrait Miniatures (1904)
- Guildford in the Olden Time: Side-Lights on the History of a Quaint Old Town (1904)
- Guildford The Ancient Crypts in the High Street, Guildford (1904)
- Richard Cosway, R.A. (1905)
- Catalogue of the Collection of Miniatures, the Property of J. Pierpont Morgan (1906)
- John Downman, A.R.A. (1907)
- George Morland: His Life and Works (1907)
- Catalogue of the Works of Art Belonging to Dr. G.C. Williamson (1909)
- Catalogue of the Collection of Jewels and Precious Works of Art: The Property of J. Pierpont Morgan (1910)
- The Strozzi Collection of Instruments by Erasmus Habermehl (1911)
- Catalogue of a collection of miniatures: The property of His Royal Highness Prince Ernest Augustus William Adolphus George Frederick, Duke of Cumberland, Duke of Brunswick-Lüneburg, K.G., G.C.H. (Priv. print) (1914)
- George, Third Earl of Cumberland (1558–1605): His Life and His Voyages: A Study from Original Documents (1920)
- Daniel Gardner, Painter in Pastel and Gouache: A Brief Account of His Life and Works (1921)
- Behind My Library Door : Some Chapters on Authors, Books and Miniatures (1921) - Published by Selwyn & Blount in England, and by E. P. Dutton in the United States.
- Curious Survivals: Habits and Customs of the Past That Still Live in the Present (1923)
- Stories of an Expert (1925)
- The Book of Famille Rose (1926)
- Signed Enamel Miniatures of the XVIIth, XVIIIth, and XIXth Centuries (1926)
- The Guildford Caverns (1930)
- English Conversation Pictures of the Eighteenth and Early Nineteenth Centuries (1931)
- The Book of Amber (1932)
- The Book of Ivory (1938)
- Recollections of Old School Days (unknown)

=== Coauthored ===
- George Engleheart, 1750–1829: Miniature Painter to George III (1902; with Henry Lewis Dillman Engleheart)
- How to Identify Portrait Miniatures (1904; with Alyn Williams)
- Cities of Northern Italy: Verona, Padua, Bologna, and Ravenna (1906; with Grant Allen)
- John Zoffany, R. A.: His Life and Works 1735–1810 (1920; with Lady Victoria Manners)
- Angelica Kauffmann, R.A.: Her Life and Her Works (1924; with Lady Victoria Manners)
- The Art of the Miniature Painter (1926; with Percy Buckman)

As Rowley Cleeve

- George Romney (1901)
- Sir Joshua Reynolds P.R.A. (1902)
