= Charles Spencelayh =

English painter

Charles Spencelayh (October 27, 1865 – June 25, 1958) was an English genre painter and portraitist in the Academic style.

Spencelayh was born in Rochester in Kent, and first studied at the National Art Training School, South Kensington. He showed his work at the Paris Salon, but most of his exhibitions were in Britain. Between 1892 and 1958, he exhibited more than 70 paintings at the Royal Academy, including "Why War" (1939), which won the Royal Academy ‘Picture of the Year’. He had a solo exhibition at The Sunderland Art Gallery in 1936.

Spencelayh was a founder member of the Royal Society of Miniature Painters, where he exhibited 129 miniatures between 1896 and 1954.

Many of his subjects were of domestic scenes, painted with an almost photographic detail, such as "The Laughing Parson" (1935) and "His Daily Ration" (1946). He also painted still life subjects including "Exploration" (1931) and "Apples" (1951).

Spencelayh was a favourite of Queen Mary, who was an avid collector of his work. In 1924 he painted a miniature of King George V for the Queen's dolls house.

On 17 December 2009, Spencelayh's masterpiece "The Old Dealer" was sold at auction at Sotheby's for over £345,000.

An exhibition of Spencelayh's work was held from 31 January to 21 June 2015 at the Guildhall Museum, Rochester.

== Selected works ==
- The Old Dealer
- The Snodland Ferry * (Guildhall Museum, Rochester, Kent)
- Failing Memories (1926)
- Time on his Hands
- Here's to Victory
- Winning the War (1945)
- Dig for Victory
- Mothers Sampler
- Overdrawn at the Bank
- The Promised Land
- That damned Cat
- The Cause of all the Trouble
- The Slump
- Old Gold
- Good Tonic
- Great Hopes (1944)
- Another Loss
- Dreams of Glory
- Annie Laurie
- Fresh Today
- The Bloom of the Season
- We will remember Them (1943)
- Early Victorian
- An Odd Lot
