= Alfred Praga =

English painter

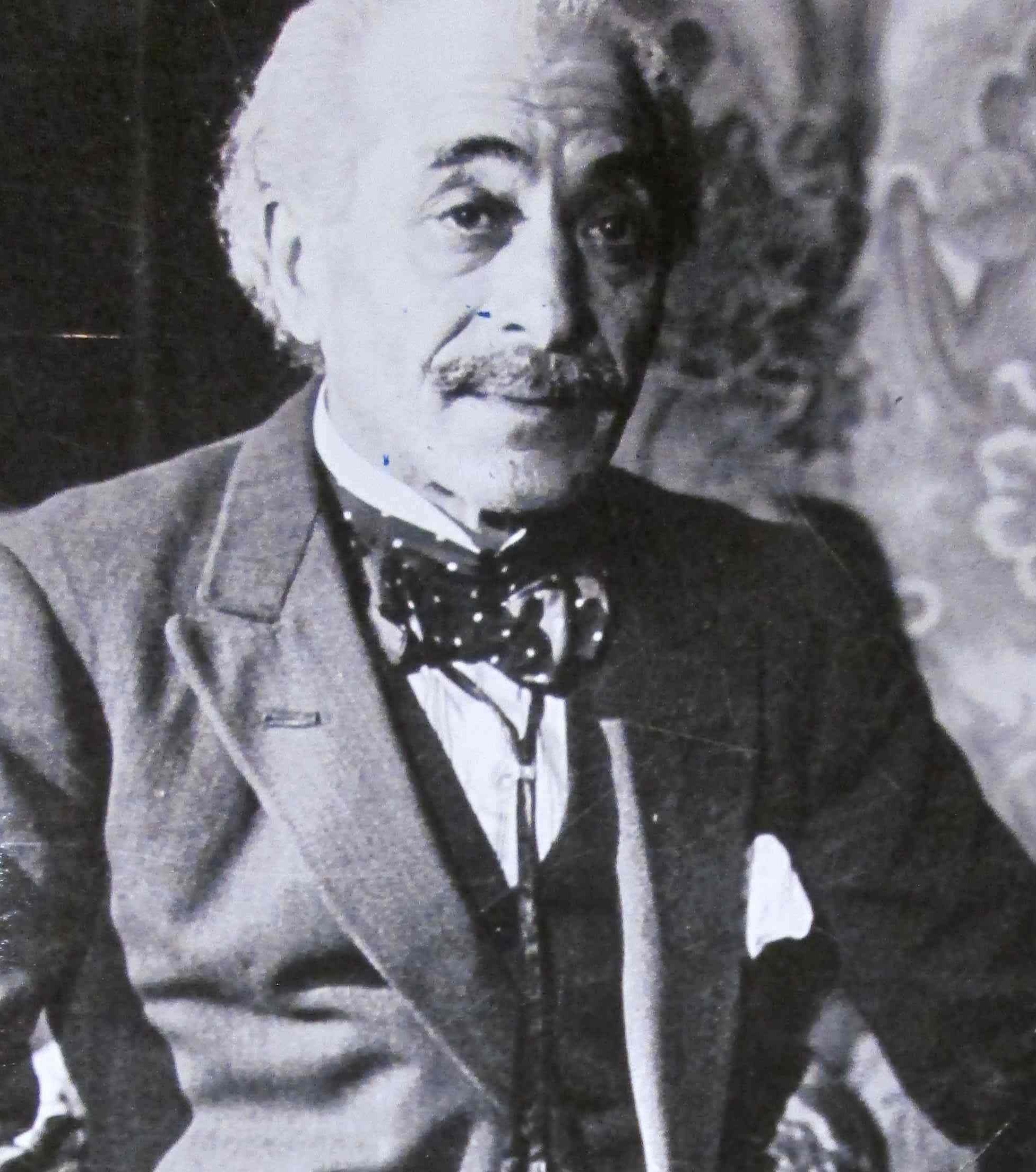
- Born: 21 September 1867; Liverpool, England
- Died: 25 February 1949 (aged 81)
- Known for: Portraits and miniatures

Alfred Praga (21 September 1867 – 25 February 1949) was an English painter. He is known primarily for his portraits and miniatures.

== Biography ==
Praga was born in Liverpool in 1867. He first studied in Paris to become a doctor but abandoned his training in favour of art. His artistic training would take him between London, Antwerp and Paris. He would become a miniaturist after some experimentation in the medium was seen by Lumsden Propert.

Praga would exhibit at the Royal Academy from 1887. He was a member of the Royal Society of British Artists as well the Chelsea Arts Club and Savage Club which held his portrait of Edward VII. Praga was also a founding member of the Society of Miniaturists (not to be confused with the identically named society created a week later).

He would run "The Praga School of Miniature and Portrait Painting" in Kensington.
