= Alyn Williams =

British miniature painter

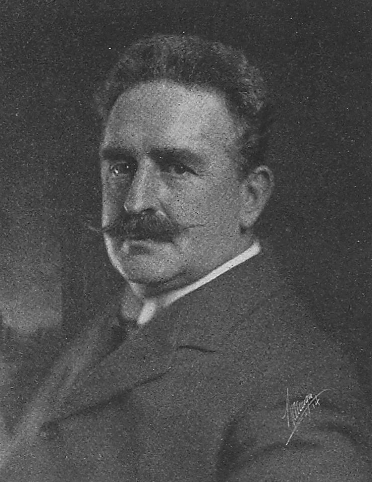
- Born: 29 August 1865; Wrexham, Wales
- Died: 1955 (aged 89–90)
- Known for: Portraits and miniatures

Alyn Williams (1865–1955) was a British portraitist and miniature painter. He is also known for leading the foundation of the Society of Miniature Painters.

== Early life and training ==
Williams was born in Wrexham, Wales in 1865. His artistic training included study at the Slade School in London as well as under J. P. Laurens in Paris.

== Career ==
In 1896 he would lead the founding of the Society of Miniature Painters, (not to be confused with a similarly named society founded by Alfred Praga just a week before) and serve as its president for some time. Williams would exhibit at the Royal Academy, the New Water Colour Society and the aforementioned Society of Miniature Painters. He would also exhibit at the Paris Salon as well as in Chicago.

Williams would find favour with the royal family when George Charles Williamson, while writing his 1904 book How to Identify Portrait Miniatures, would ask Queen Alexandra to sit for a portrait by Williams whom he said he considered as "standing at the head of English miniature painters". In 1914, the Fine Arts Journal would describe him as "one of England's leading miniaturists", describing him as one of the most influential figures of miniature painting of the time.

His sitters would include Benito Mussolini, William Howard Taft and Edward VII.
