= Royal Society of Miniature Painters, Sculptors and Gravers =

Royal Miniature Society
- Royal Society of Miniature Painters, Sculptors and Gravers
- Formation: 1895; 131 years ago
- Founder: Alyn Williams
- Founded at: London, England
- President: Tom Mulliner
- Patron: Charles III
- Website: royal-miniature-society.org.uk

The Royal Society of Miniature Painters, Sculptors and Gravers, more commonly known as the Royal Miniature Society (RMS), is an art society founded in 1895 dedicated to upholding and continuing the tradition of miniature painting and sculpture, generally meaning the painted portrait miniature, a particular English tradition.

The Society's aims are to "esteem, protect and practise the traditional 16th Century art of miniature work, emphasising the infinite patience needed for its fine techniques." Since 2002, its patron has been Charles III.

== History ==
The Society was founded in 1896 by Alyn Williams, originally as The Society of Miniature Painters. A royal charter was granted by King Edward VII in 1904, and it became the Royal Miniature Society.

To highlight the Society's growing importance, the President's Jewel was commissioned in 1920. This is a large, elaborate silver chain of office designed and made by Alfred Lyndhurst Pocock which is still worn by the current president at formal functions.

In 1926, the Society's scope was extended to include sculptors and gravers, and its name was changed by the Royal Command of King George V to become the Royal Society of Miniature Painters, Sculptors and Gravers.

Since its foundation, the Society has had ten different presidents, including Sir William Blake Richmond (1899 to 1907) and Raymond Lister (1970 to 1980). The current president, elected in 2025, is Tom Mulliner.

== Exhibitions and awards ==
=== Annual exhibition ===
The Society's annual exhibition of around 650 works is held each year at the Mall Galleries in London. A wide range of subject matter is featured, including portrait, landscape, still life and abstract paintings, in addition to sculpture.

A centennial exhibition, opened by Lord Gowrie, was held in 1995 at Westminster Central Hall in London.

=== Awards ===
The Society's Gold Memorial Bowl Award, established in 1985, is one of the highest accolades for miniature art in the world. Crafted in 18 carat gold by royal jewellers Garrard & Co, the Bowl was a gift to the Society from former president Suzanne Lucas. A silver gilt replica is received by the winning artist.

Other awards include:

- The Prince of Wales Award for Outstanding Miniature Painting
- The President's Special Commendation
- The Society's Award for the Best Group of Work
- The Mundy Sovereign Portrait Award
- The Bidder and Borne Award
- Peter Charles Booth Memorial Award
- Anita Emmerich Presentation Award
- Anthony J Lester Art Critics Award
- Anthony J Lester Young Artists Award
- Arturi Phillips 'Connoisseur' Award
- The Elizabeth Meek Award
- People's Choice Award
- Joan Cornish Willies Award for Outstanding Traditional Miniature Oil Painting
- Award for Innovation

== Membership ==
An artist is eligible for consideration for Associate Membership (ARMS) if they have had five works accepted in the previous annual exhibition. If all five works submitted for the current exhibition are accepted then the Selection Committee will consider them for election to Associate Membership.

To be considered for election to full Membership (RMS), Associate Members must have five works accepted in three exhibitions running. Six works must be submitted and accepted in the fourth year. The decision is then voted on by the Selection Committee.

== Art form ==
Miniature portrait painting dates back to the 16th century and was introduced by artists of the Tudor Court including Hans Holbein the Younger, later continued by artists including Nicholas Hilliard, Isaac Oliver and Samuel Cooper. Modern miniature painting respects many of the principles originally set by Hilliard.

When the Society was founded, the maximum size for a miniature was 12 by 10 inches. Today, the permitted size varies depending on shape and medium, but paintings (including frame and mount) should have a diameter of no more than 4.5 inches. Sculptures should not exceed 8 inches along the longest measurement, including the base.

Elizabeth Meek, who held the post of President between 2004 and 2013, describes working in miniature as the most demanding of all painting genre. Meek names some of the qualities required as, "concentration, stillness of mind and body and a dogged perseverance for perfection."

Emma Rutherford, of art dealers Philip Mould & Co, says of the miniature art form, "they are not merely painting made small, the technique is entirely different and comes directly from the discipline of medieval manuscript illumination."

== Past members ==
- Gladys Kathleen Bell (1882-1965)
- Henry Harding Bingley
- Reginald Easton (1807-1892)
- Nellie M. Hepburn-Edmunds (1870-1953)
- May de Montravel Edwardes (1887-1967)
- Dudley Hardy (1867-1922)
- John Hassall (1868-1948)
- Edith Mary Hinchley (1870-1940)
- Hal Hurst (1865-1938)
- Mrs Mabel Lee Hankey (1863-1943)
- John Mennie (1911-1987)
- Cecil Watson Quinnell (1868-1932)
- Omar Ramsden (1873-1939)
- Henry Saxon
- Miss Eileen Alice Soper (1905-1990)
- Charles Spencelayh (1865-1958)
- Cecil Thomas
- Charles James Turrell (1846-1932)
- Elsie Maud White (1889-1978)
- Margaret Foote Hawley
