= List of people from the Royal Borough of Kensington and Chelsea =

This is a list of people from the Royal Borough of Kensington and Chelsea, England, who have become known internationally in different roles and professions. The Royal Borough of Kensington and Chelsea is a central London borough of Royal borough status. After the City of Westminster, it is the wealthiest borough in England.

- Freddie Adkins
- Betty Boo, singer and songwriter
- John Wall Callcott
- Cyril Chadwick
- Frederic Chancellor
- Arthur Cullin
- Coningsby Disraeli
- Paul Drayson, Baron Drayson
- Marc Fitch
- Nicholas Freeman
- Joan Hanham, Baroness Hanham
- Letitia Elizabeth Landon, poet
- Conrad Lant, bassist/vocalist for heavy metal band Venom
- Lakshmi Mittal
- Stephen Poliakoff
- Robin Renwick, Baron Renwick of Clifton
- Shireen Ritchie, Baroness Ritchie
- Sir John Richard Robinson
- Nicholas Scott
- George Smith
- Tim Woodward
