= Raymond Lister =

British art historian (1919–2001)

Raymond Lister

Raymond Lister (1919–2001) was an English blacksmith/ironworker, author, artist, and a leading authority on Samuel Palmer.

== Life ==
Lister was born and spent most of his life in Cambridge. During his career he had made the artistic ironwork for many buildings, including King's College Chapel, Cambridge, and chancel gates for a London church, founded his own publishing company, the Golden Head Press, became a member of Wolfson College, Cambridge, and was governor of the Federation of British Artists from 1972 to 1980. He came to widest public attention, outside Palmer circles, when he was called as an expert witness in the 1976 trial of Tom Keating the noted forger. He was also a noted collector of Oxford & Cambridge college stamps and private telegraph company stamps, about which he wrote books.

== Selected publications ==
=== Arts ===
- William Blake: An Introduction to the Man and to His Work. Continuum International, 1970. ISBN 0-8044-2531-0
- Decorative Wrought Ironwork in Great Britain. Tuttle Publishing, 1970. ISBN 0-8048-0902-X
- Antique Maps and Cartographers. Shoestring Press, 1970. ISBN 0-208-01041-6
- Samuel Palmer, A Biography. Faber and Faber, London, 1974. ISBN 0-571-09732-4
- The Letters of Samuel Palmer. (Ed.) Oxford University Press, 1975. ISBN 0-19-817309-1
- George Richmond. Robin Garton, 1981. ISBN 0-906030 13 7,
- British Romantic Painting. Cambridge University Press, 1984. ISBN 0-521-35687-3
- Prints and Printmaking : A Dictionary and Handbook of the Art in Nineteenth-Century Britain. Methuen, 1984. ISBN 0-413-40130-8
- The Paintings of Samuel Palmer. Cambridge University Press, 1986.
- The Paintings of William Blake. Cambridge University Press, 1986. ISBN 0-521-30538-1
- Catalogue Raisonné of the Works of Samuel Palmer. Cambridge University Press, 1988.
- Samuel Palmer: His Life and Art. Cambridge University Press, 1988. ISBN 0-521-32850-0
- Samuel Palmer and The Ancients. Cambridge University Press, 1991. ISBN 978-0-521-27847-8

=== Philately ===
- A catalogue of Swedish local postage stamps issued from 1941 to 1947.
- College stamps of Oxford and Cambridge.
- Private telegraph companies of Great Britain and their stamps. Golden Head Press, Cambridge, 1961.

=== Memoir ===
- With my own wings: The memoirs of Raymond Lister, Oleander Press, 1994. ISBN 9780906672662

=== Other ===
- There Was a Star Danced... Linton, Cambridge, 1983. A 32-copies limited edition art work on Irina Baronova
