= Fine Arts Journal =

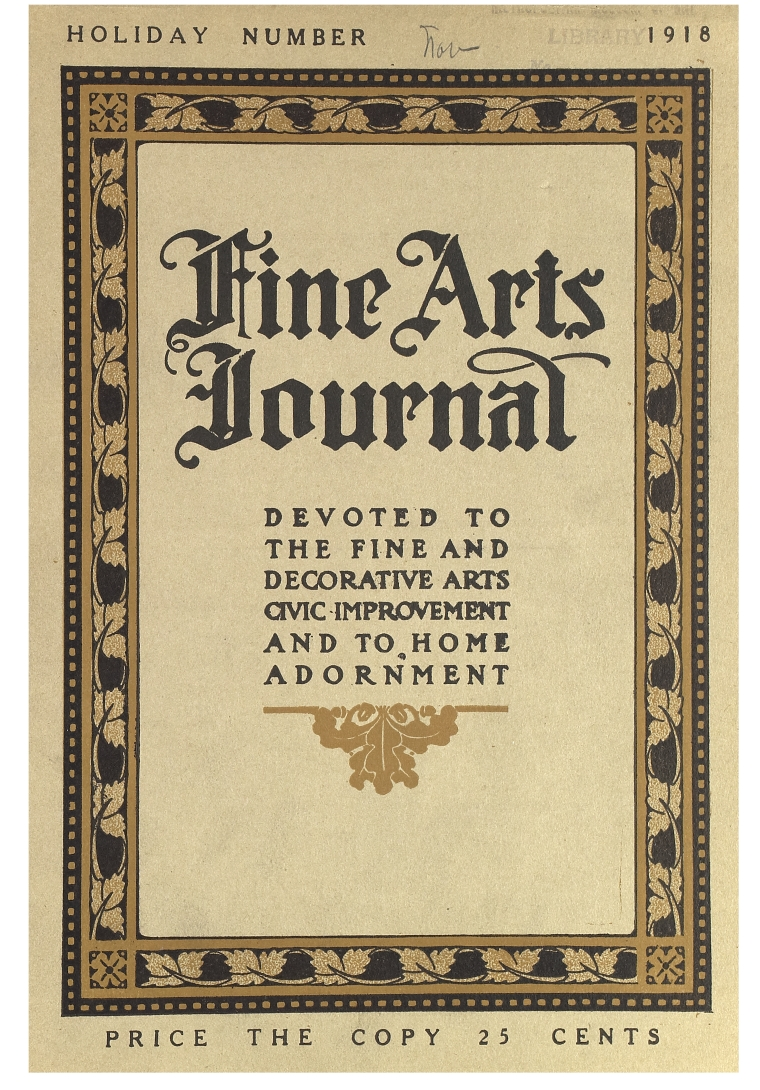
- Categories: Fine arts, applied arts
- Frequency: Monthly
- Founded: 1899
- Final issue: September 1919
- Country: USA
- Based in: Chicago
- ISSN: 2151-2760

The Fine Arts Journal, published in Chicago from 1899 to 1919, was an art magazine devoted to the fine arts and increasingly to the arts in the broadest sense. The editor to 1905 was Marian A. White, who sought to make the journal a vehicle "to promote and foster a love for art American in type and the work of the American artist in particular", but resigned when she felt the publisher was insisting that it be a "write-up periodical". From 1907 it was adopted as the official publication of the National Art Society, also based in Chicago.

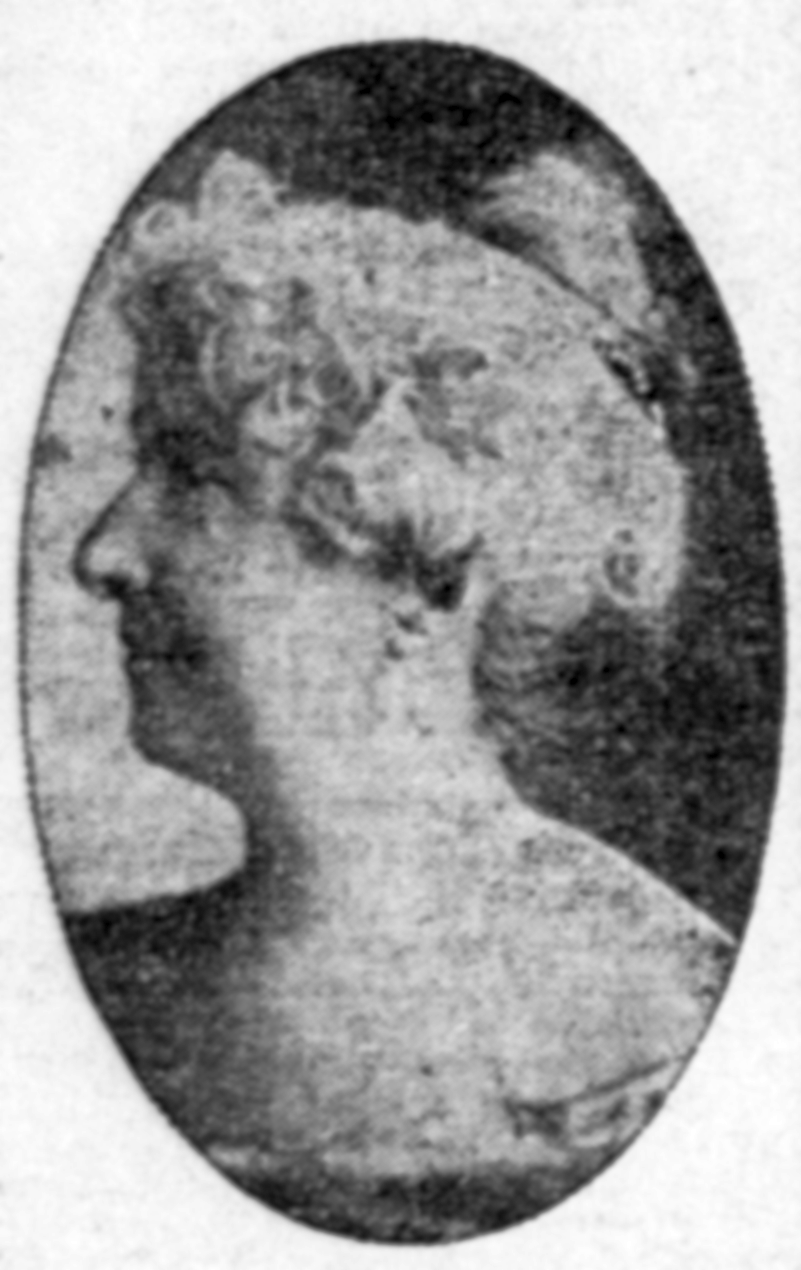
Marian A. White

== Editors ==
- Marian A. White (1899-1905)
- Evelyn M. Stuart (1905-1910)
- James William Pattison (1910-1915)
