= The Goddess: A Demon =

1900 novel by Richard March

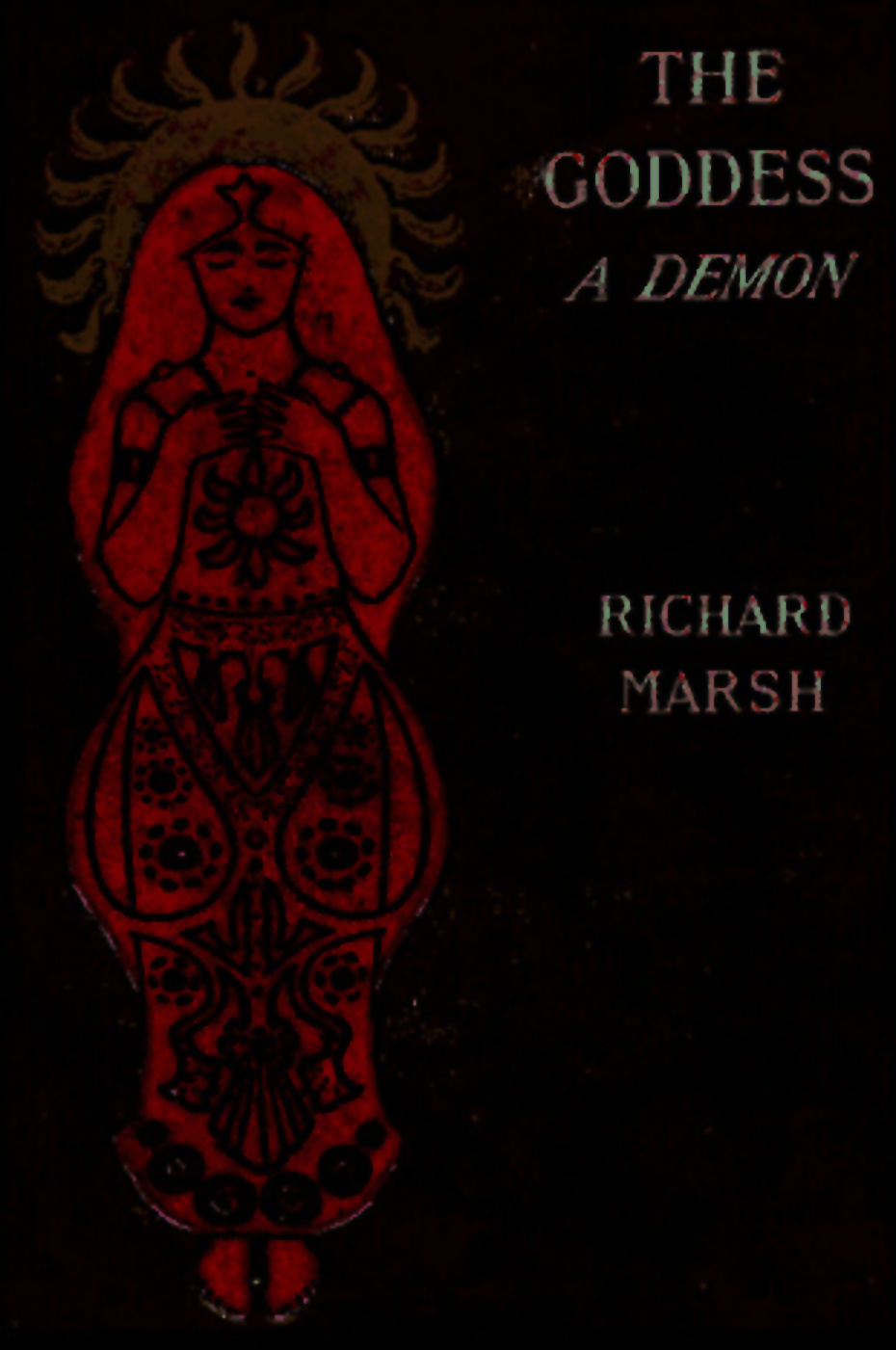
Book cover

The Goddess: A Demon (1900) is a novel by Richard Marsh. It was originally serialized in Manchester Weekly Times and Salford Weekly News in twelve installments between 12 January 1900 and 30 March 1900. It was one of eight books Marsh published in as many months. The Goddess: a Demon followed Marsh's smash The Beetle. The Goddess: a Demon was not as successful as The Beetle, but is one of Marsh's more recognized publications.

The novel is a first person account by John Ferguson of his friend Edwin Lawrence's brutal murder, the beautiful woman who dropped through his window on the same night and the subsequent quest to solve the murder. Along the way Ferguson encounters threats he never expected and supernatural aspects he never imagined.

The Goddess: a Demon was published at the turn of the twentieth century and the novel addresses the discomfort that came with the uncertainty of the changing of the decades. It also reflects the threat of the Imperial system that Britain had created in India. The New Woman is represented and cast in a negative light and viewed as a threat to traditional British society.

== Literary and historical background ==
Richard Marsh is a pseudonym for Richard Bernard Heldmann. Marsh switched to the pseudonym to leave his sordid past behind. Bernard Heldmann was a rather famous criminal for committing fraud and forgery across the English and French countryside. He was thought to be sentenced to 18 months of hard labor in 1884. These ideas are visible in The Goddess: A Demon in Edwin's forgery of his brother's documents and his acquisition of false currency.

Marsh was extremely prolific, producing 80 volumes and other short stories. His work mostly revolved around horror and crime stories, but he also wrote romance and humor, often combining all of the genres.

The Goddess: A Demon was published in the wake of much other work by Marsh. Manchester Weekly Times, a publication that had run a lot of his work, including Marsh's novella The Woman with One Hand in 1899, published it. The paper also published Marsh's “In Full Cry” (1899), “The Strange Fortune of Pollie Blythe: The Story of a Chinese ‘God’” (1900) and “The Man in the Glass Cage; or The Strange Story of the Twickenham Peerage" (1901). His name was so regular to the Manchester Weekly Times that they began to advertise his pieces once including a long paragraph about his work.

His success is not far to seek. He brings to his work gifts of a very rare order; he is a delightfully unconventional writer, and tells a story in quite a unique way. Combining something of the sensationalism of Wilkie Collins with a humorous insight reminding one of Charles Dickens, his stile exhibits qualities which it owes to neither of these famous novelists, nor to any other. It is characterized by a peculiar directness and vigour which invest the narrative with fascinating interest. As for plot and incident, it is sufficient to say that in all Mr. Marsh’s stories the movement is very rapid, and the reader is hurried forward with breathless interest.

The Goddess: A Demon was a highly anticipated periodical for Marsh and was a selling point of Manchester Weekly Times.

== Synopsis ==
The novel opens with John Ferguson and Edwin Lawrence playing cards together. After the game breaks up Ferguson owes Lawrence some £1800. Ferguson is convinced, however, that Lawrence cheated. After falling asleep Ferguson has a very realistic dream of Lawrence getting viciously attacked by a figure that he cannot identify. He then wakes up in a cold sweat to a woman climbing in his window. After questioning her he determines that she has amnesia and no idea of who she is or how she came to be completely covered in blood.

Ferguson, struck by the woman's incredible beauty and childlike behavior takes her to his landlady, Mrs. Peddar, who reluctantly takes her in for the night. On his way back to his room he encounters the Porter, Turner, who tells Ferguson of Lawrence's brother rushing out of the Imperial Mansions with a large parcel in a rude fashion. Ferguson thinks little of it at the time and returns to his rooms.

The next morning Ferguson finds out that Lawrence was indeed brutally murdered the previous night, stabbed by some 50 different blades. His body is found nearly unrecognizable and ravaged. The case is then opened of who the murderer is. Dr. Hume, the first to arrive on the scene, immediately suspects Ferguson himself as Ferguson is meandering around the scene and conspicuously presents the abandoned collar of Philip Lawrence. Hume, a friend of Philip's, turns his suspicions to Ferguson and sets to mounting a case against him.

Ferguson sets about determining the identity of the woman who climbed in his window. He found an image with her likeness in Lawrence's room and takes it to a shop that identifies her as the famous actress Bessie Moore. Ferguson deduces where she lives and enlists her friend and roommate Miss Adair to help him revive Bessie's memory.

Meanwhile, the police's suspect quickly becomes the curious woman lacking memory. She returns to the room of the murder and reenacts the murder of Edwin Lawrence, effectively implicating herself. Her memory returns slowly and when she sees Miss Adair it is further improved. She leaves with Miss Adair and falls into a fever.

Ferguson encounters Bessie's brother, Tom, and reveals that Tom is a forger who had been forging documents for Edwin with his brother's name on them. Ferguson endeavors to find Philip, who has gone missing, because Mr. Morley, Philip's attendant, believes that Philip may have had a hand in Edwin's murder. Mr. Morley saw Philip run out claiming to be going to kill Edwin after receiving word that his brother had been forging checks with his name on them. Philip is quick tempered and often fought his brother over matters of money. Generally after overreacting and striking his brother, Philip would give Edwin money. Ferguson also finds Mr. Bernstein, a loan shark, who is entangled in the same mess and loaning Edwin money that he cannot repay.

It is revealed that not only was Bessie in the room while Edwin was being murdered, but so was Philip and Ferguson. Philip can still not be located for comment and Ferguson, as is revealed by Hume an early psychologist, has frequent bouts of memory loss.

The officials target Bessie as the murderer and Ferguson does everything in his power, including admitting to the murder himself, perjury and force, to keep them from her. He finally is going to flee London with her when they come across Edwin Lawrence himself.

Edwin leads them to his hideout, prattling on about a Goddess, a demon, who he can constantly hear laughing that has been influencing his recent actions. He tells Ferguson, Bessie, Hume, an inspector, Tom Moore and Mr. Bernstein the story of his downward spiral. Edwin was in need of excessive money and got it from his brother. His brother finally cut him off and he turned to Mr. Bernstein to help fund him. However he could not pay Mr. Bernstein back and Mr. Bernstein introduced the idea of forged checks. Mr. Bernstein then introduced Edwin to Tom Moore who could forge his brother's signature.

His story eventually came back around to the night that Edwin and Ferguson played cards. Edwin revealed that he had cheated in order to get reliable money. Philip eventually found out Edwin's plot and came to confront his brother about his betrayal. Bessie, the same night, came to Edwin's to confront him about his involvement with her brother. Edwin then called upon his Goddess, that was a Hindu idol that he had purchased in India, to solve his issues with his brother. The Goddess impaled Philip with over 50 different blades, rendering him unrecognizable. He then clothed his brother in Edwin's clothes and took the idol and rushed out, which is when Turner saw him. Edwin pulls the cord, to demonstrate the powers of his goddess and gets impaled by fifty blades, instantly dying.

Afterward, Hume mostly retires, practicing only occasionally. Bessie and Ferguson get married, after Bessie recovers from her brief bout with madness. Tom goes abroad and dies. And Miss Adair contemplates retiring from the theater.

== Characters ==
Edwin Lawrence: Edwin is the subject of the novel. His violent death begins the novel and it is later revealed that he is broke, manipulative and spent time traveling in India.

John Ferguson: Protagonist and narrator, John Ferguson is a friend to Edwin Lawrence and leads his murder investigation because of his desire to prove Bessie's innocence. After Bessie climbs into his window, John falls in love with her and is willing to do anything to protect her. John is a hulking man of great physical power and less command of speech, he uses this to his advantage.

Bessie Moore: Bessie is an actress who has amnesia and climbs into John Ferguson's window covered in blood. She spends the majority of the novel with a debilitating fever.

Tom Moore/George Withers: Tom Moore is the wayward brother of Bessie Moore and his false name is George Withers. He is a forger for Edwin.

Miss Adair: Miss Adair is an actress, Bessie's best friend and roommate.

Philip Lawrence: Philip Lawrence is the brother to Edwin Lawrence and he is the primary subject of the investigation because he is impossibly wealthy, bad tempered and violent. He was supporting his brother and had a probable drinking problem.

Mr. Morley: Mr. Morley is Philip Lawrence's attendant. He often overhears Philip's rages and implicated Philip to John Ferguson.

Mr. Bernstein: Mr. Bernstein is a loan shark who connects Edwin Lawrence with Tom Moore.

Dr. Hume: Dr. Hume is in love with Bessie and therefore hates John Ferguson. Hume tries to help with the investigation while also trying to prove John Ferguson's guilt. Hume is also good friends with Philip and is intent on proving his innocence.

The Goddess: The Goddess is more of a figure throughout the novel. She does not make a concrete appearance until the end, but is an overarching threat throughout. It is revealed that "The Goddess" that Edwin Lawrence refers to is in fact a small relic that Edwin Lawrence acquired on his trip to India. It produces the sinister laughter that both Bessie and John Ferguson claim to hear the night that Edwin died.

== Genre and style ==
The Goddess: A Demon spans multiple genres by Victorian standards. The Goddess: A Demon is a mystery centered around solving the brutal murder of Edwin Lawrence. The novel takes place in London and the foreignness of London after the Goddess arrives. There is a focus on the fog and crowdedness of London throughout the novel that makes the city strange and threatening. John Ferguson takes it upon himself to attempt to solve the murder of his friend while protecting a woman. Marsh's novel is sinister and brings in multiple genres and themes.

The Goddess: A Demon is a sensation novel. Early reviews of it place it within the sensation genre and it fits well. The novel is based in a realistic setting and has realistic events, but also aspects of the supernatural as well as tendencies for the fantastic. There is a lot of physical literal danger from the Goddess in the novel as well as more abstract threatening from the Goddess. Both contribute to a realistic feel, but a fantastic aspect. The issues Goddess's actions and influence contribute to a strong feeling of suspense that is maintained throughout the novel.

This novel is also a Gothic work. A stranger climbs into John Ferguson's window and he is immediately taken with her. The novel seamlessly combines horror and romance in Ferguson's desperation to keep his love from trouble and danger while also trying to solve the mystery of his friend's brutal murder. The nefarious actions of the Goddess make the novel dark and threatening while supporting a love story secondarily.

Marsh's novel is also a work of imperial and invasion literature. The Goddess is a threat from India that infiltrates English and London society. She influences Edwin Lawrence into debauchery and ruin after he takes an idol from India. The Goddess also exerts influence of Bessie Moore and ends up ruining Edwin and disturbing Bessie. The Goddess threatens the Victorian way of life. She is able to go to London and wreaks havoc in English territory.

== Themes ==
=== The New Woman ===
The New Woman is a theme explored in The Goddess: A Demon. Like many novels of the time such as, Haggard’s She and Marsh’s The Beetle, the New Woman is not portrayed in a particularly good light. The Goddess has overwhelming power, including the power of mesmerizing, and uses it to do harm to English men and society. She is a threat to the English and Victorian way of life. As a woman who does not fit into the constraints of women of the time she poses a threat to society as a whole, which is only compounded upon by her inherent foreignness that is a product of her being from India.

Bessie Moore is nothing like a New Woman. She is helpless and unable to protect herself or even remember anything about her attack. She is totally reliant on the male characters in the novel to protect her. She follows the usual characteristics of a Victorian woman. She is demure and well-behaved and she waits patiently for a husband and falls in love with John nearly as soon as they meet. Bessie fits into the traditional gender roles and is portrayed as the perfect woman, who is sought after and fought over because of it.

=== Fear of cultural change ===
There is a theme of fear of cultural change is a predominant theme throughout the novel. There is clear discomfort throughout the novel about the changing landscape of London and the effect that Imperialism and changing social norms have on society. The way the Goddess changes the perception of London in a negative way and infiltrates society in a destructive sense reflects this discomfort with changes in life. The Goddess is able to come to London unnoticed and without trouble. Her power over men makes it easy for her to infiltrate London. She represents the threat of India, post British colonization. "Some queer things still take place in India." She is completely foreign in her ways and tactics of influencing men and a threat because of it.

At the end of the nineteenth century, or the fin de siècle, there was a lot of discomfort with the changing landscape of London. The city became sprawling and crowded. The population multiplied quickly and London became very urban very quickly. The discomfort with this expansion can be seen particularly in the end of the novel with the crowding at the port. The crowds are referred to as "the hustling throng" and are said to cause a "hubbub." This sort of imagery is repeated throughout the novel whenever the characters walk the streets. London is also always described as dank and foggy, reflecting an uneasiness with the state of the city. Instead of an idealized city, London is portrayed as threatening, the perfect place for a demon to hide.

== Critical reception ==
A short review of The Goddess: a Demon was published in The Spectator from August 1900, just five months after serial publication of the novel ended. The review stated that “Mr. Marsh sets out to make one’s flesh creep in his story, The Goddess : a Demon, and his sanguinary idol is certainly a very ingenious invention.” It praises the novel for its commitment to pure sensationalism and concludes that “it is not at all a bad specimen of its class.”

In The Academy, published November 1900, addresses the issue of the overwhelming volume of literary work being produced at the time in an article titled, The Yarning School. The article suggests that the market was overrun with fiction because of the increase in literacy but not necessarily intelligence and elevated thinking, therefore there was a lot of simple genre fiction. The article also points out that for a time, Marsh was producing a novel a month (a point he refuted). The article is not particularly complimentary. It says, “In The Goddess : a Demon, he relied on his sub-title to secure immediate attention to certain weird happenings in Imperial-mansions; particularly the goings on of “The Woman who Came Through the Window.” The public who will accept the solution of this story will accept anything.” The anonymous author critiques Marsh’s plot complexity and accuses Marsh of falling into the trap of serial authors who produce quantities of low quality work.

A review published on 11 August 1900 in the Academy calls the latest installment of Marsh’s then periodical, “red-hot melodrama.” It also asserts that it is “capital reading for Margate.” This was a very harsh comment on the novel as the Academy included high-culture.

The Athenaeum gave the novel a slightly kinder review saying the novel “reflects credit on the imagination of the author.” It also said that the novel “has merit as a shocker, and is fairly well written.” The journal praised Marsh's command of the story, saying the novel's “solution is postponed with a skill that is equally creditable. There is a good deal of naïve humour about Ferguson and his narrative.”
