= Richard Marsh (author) =

Journalist and novelist

- Born: 12 October 1857; North London, England
- Died: 9 August 1915 (aged 57); Haywards Heath, West Sussex, England
- Other name: Richard Bernard Heldmann
- Occupation: Novelist
- Years active: 1880–1915
- Known for: Genre fiction, including horror, crime, romance, and humour
- Notable work: The Beetle (1897)

Richard Marsh (12 October 1857 – 9 August 1915) was the pseudonym of the English author born Richard Bernard Heldmann. A best-selling and prolific author of the late 19th century and the Edwardian period, Marsh is best known now for his supernatural thriller novel The Beetle, which was published the same year as Bram Stoker's Dracula (1897), and was initially even more popular, outselling Dracula six times over. The Beetle remained in print until 1960. Marsh produced nearly 80 volumes of fiction and numerous short stories, in genres including horror, crime, romance and humour. Many of these have been republished recently, beginning with The Beetle in 2004. Marsh's grandson Robert Aickman was a notable writer of short "strange stories".

== Biography ==
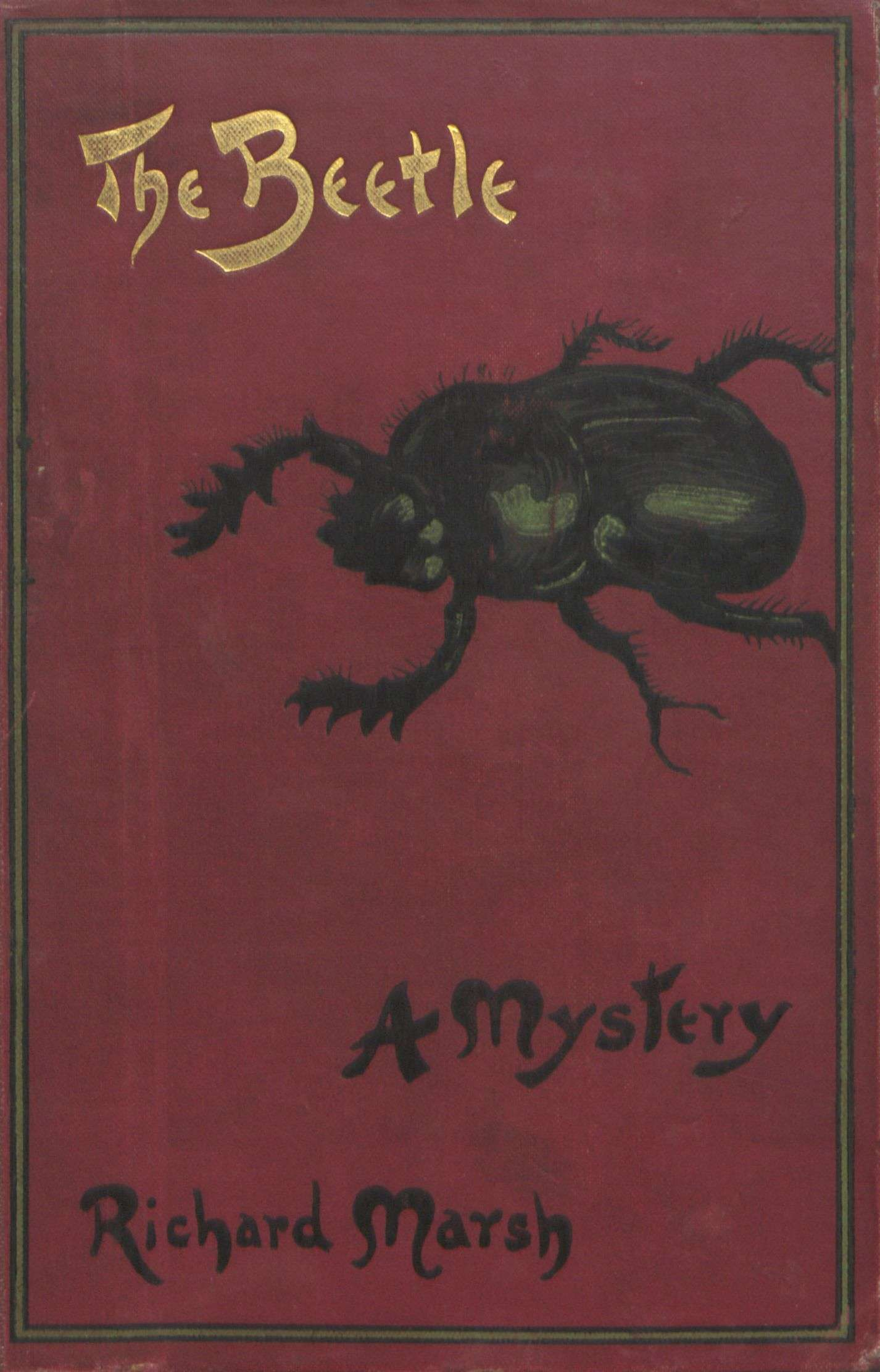
Front cover of The Beetle

Richard Bernard Heldmann was born on 12 October 1857, in North London, to lace merchant Joseph Heldmann (1827–96) and Emma Marsh (1830–1911), a lace-manufacturer's daughter. Heldmann began publishing fiction during 1880, in the form of boys' school and adventure stories for magazine publications. The most important of these was Union Jack, a high quality boys' weekly magazine associated with authors G. A. Henty (1832–1902) and W. H. G. Kingston (1814–80). Henty promoted the young Heldmann to the position of co-editor in October 1882, but Heldmann's association with the publication was ended abruptly in June 1883. After this, Bernard Heldmann published no further fiction under that name, and began to use the pseudonym "Richard Marsh" a few years later. (Note: The pseudonym combines his own given first name with his mother's maiden name. It was also his maternal grandfather's name.)

For a long time the reasons for the end of Heldmann's business relationship with Henty and his adoption of a pseudonym were a mystery, with some scholars suggesting that Heldmann was anxious to obscure his father's German-Jewish origins. In the twenty-first century the discovery was made that Heldmann had been sentenced to eighteen months' hard labour at the West Kent Quarter Sessions on 10 April 1884 (Note: Callum James gives the date as 9 April 1884.) for issuing a series of forged cheques in Britain and France during 1883. (Note: Marsh was described in court as being of respectable parents, a journalist by profession, mostly working on boys' cheap literature, although he had connections with some of the chief London publishing firms. However, more than once he had been in pecuniary difficulties. Marsh opened a bank account at the Acton Branch of the London and South Western Bank in March 1883. He was not known to the bank, but was introduced by his brother, who held an account there. He was issued with a cheque book with 100 cheques. On 16 May 1883 the bank refused a cheque drawn by Marsh as he had insufficient funds. The bank wrote to March on 21 May 1883 to warn him that the bank would close his account if he did not maintain sufficient funds to meet his cheques. In all he presented fraudulent totalling over £1,200. After the bank wrote to Marsh, they received 13 cheques from his book up to January 1884, eight of which were in his own name and five of which were in other names. In at least one case, he presented a cheque payable to an alias, but signed by himself. The aliases he used included: Captain George Roberts, Captain Henderson,, Mr. R. Henderson; Captain Evans of the 17th lancers; Captain George Martyn of the Indian Army (Note: This name was also given as Captain Slade Martyn); Albert Hugh Sinclair; Doctor Wilson.; Among the fraudulent cheques were: A cheque for £200 in Guernsey against which he received £50 in advance.; A cheque for £900 in Tours, France, against which he received £100 on account.; When he was arrested, it was found that his watch and chain had been taken from a hotelier in Exeter, and his Ulster overcoat from a person at Folkestone.)

Heldmann adopted his pseudonym on his release from jail, and fictions by "Richard Marsh" began appearing in literary periodicals during 1888, with two novels being published in 1893. Marsh wrote and published prolifically during the 1890s and the early years of the 20th century. He died from heart disease in Haywards Heath in Sussex on 9 August 1915. Several of his novels were published posthumously.

== Fiction ==
=== The Beetle ===
Marsh's greatest commercial success was one of his earlier novels, The Beetle (1897). A story about a mysterious oriental person who pursues a British politician to London, where he wreaks havoc with his powers of hypnosis and shape-shifting, Marsh's novel is similar in some respects to certain other novels of the same period, such as Bram Stoker's Dracula, George du Maurier's Trilby, and Sax Rohmer's Fu Manchu novels. Like Dracula and many of the sensation novels pioneered by Wilkie Collins and others during the 1860s, The Beetle is narrated from the perspectives of multiple characters, a technique used in many late 19th-century novels (those of Wilkie Collins and Stoker, for example) to create suspense. The novel engages with numerous themes and problems of the Victorian fin de siècle, including the New Woman, unemployment and urban destitution, radical politics, vice and homosexuality, science, and Britain's imperial engagements (in particular those in Egypt and the Sudan). "The Beetle" sold out upon its initial printing, and continued to sell well and to be published for several decades into the 20th century. The novel was made into a film in 1919, with Leal Douglas in "the polymorphous title role", and adapted for the London stage in 1928.

The first edition of The Beetle had four illustrations by John Williamson which are shown below. Vuohelainen states that these four illustrations illuminated "occult, criminal and romantic developments in the novel and thus appealing to different reader interests". Images by courtesy of the British Library.

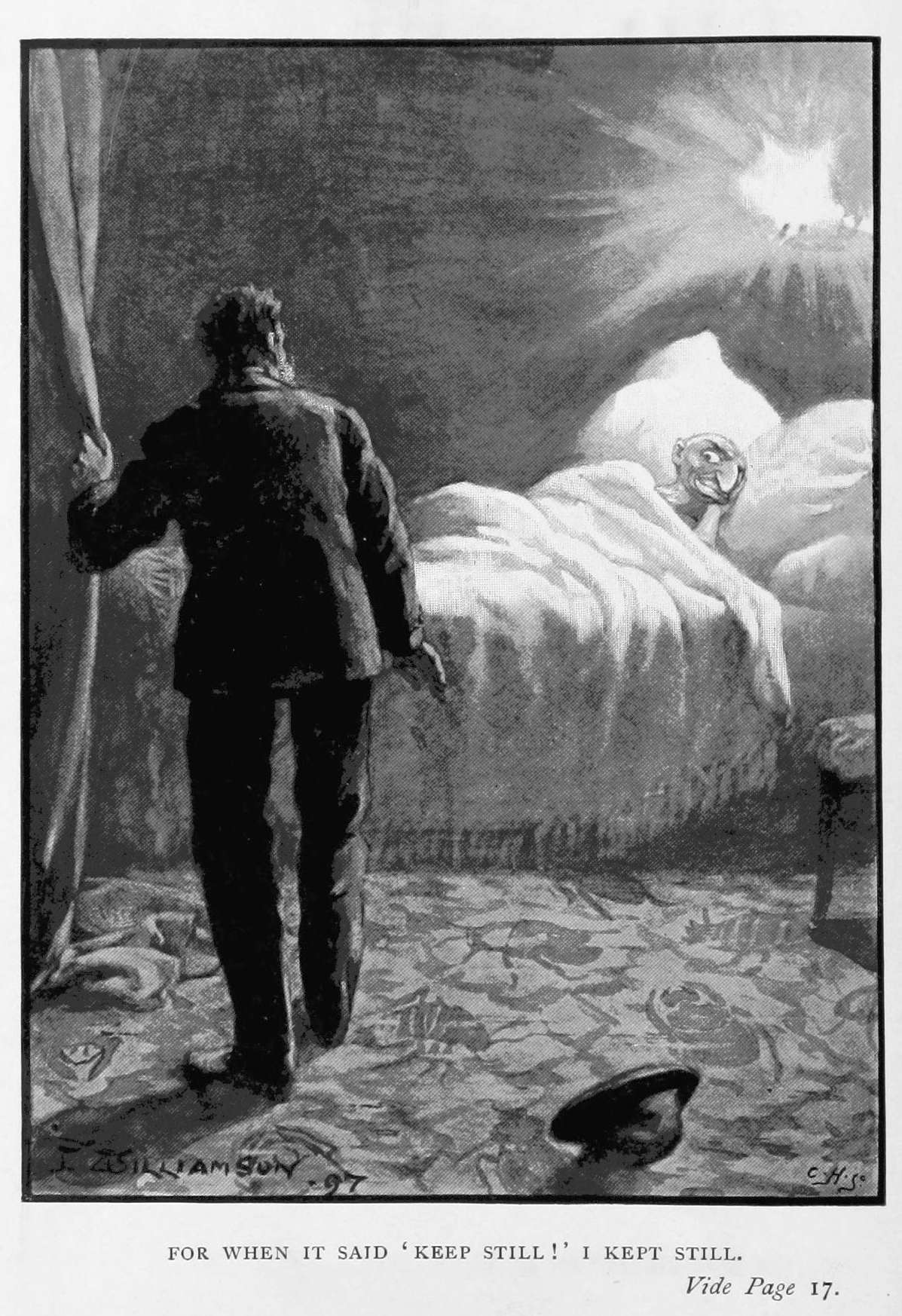
Page-017

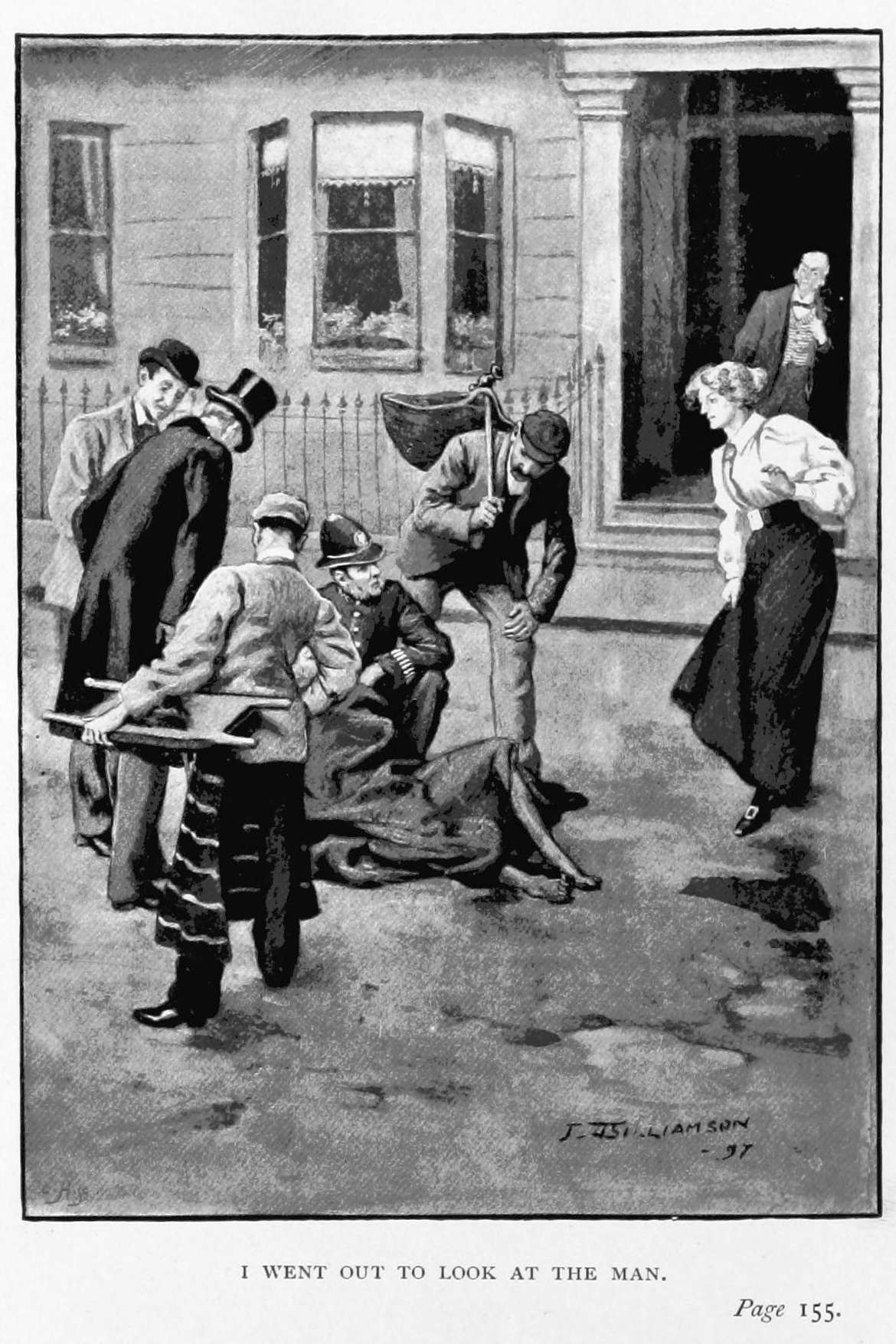
Page-155

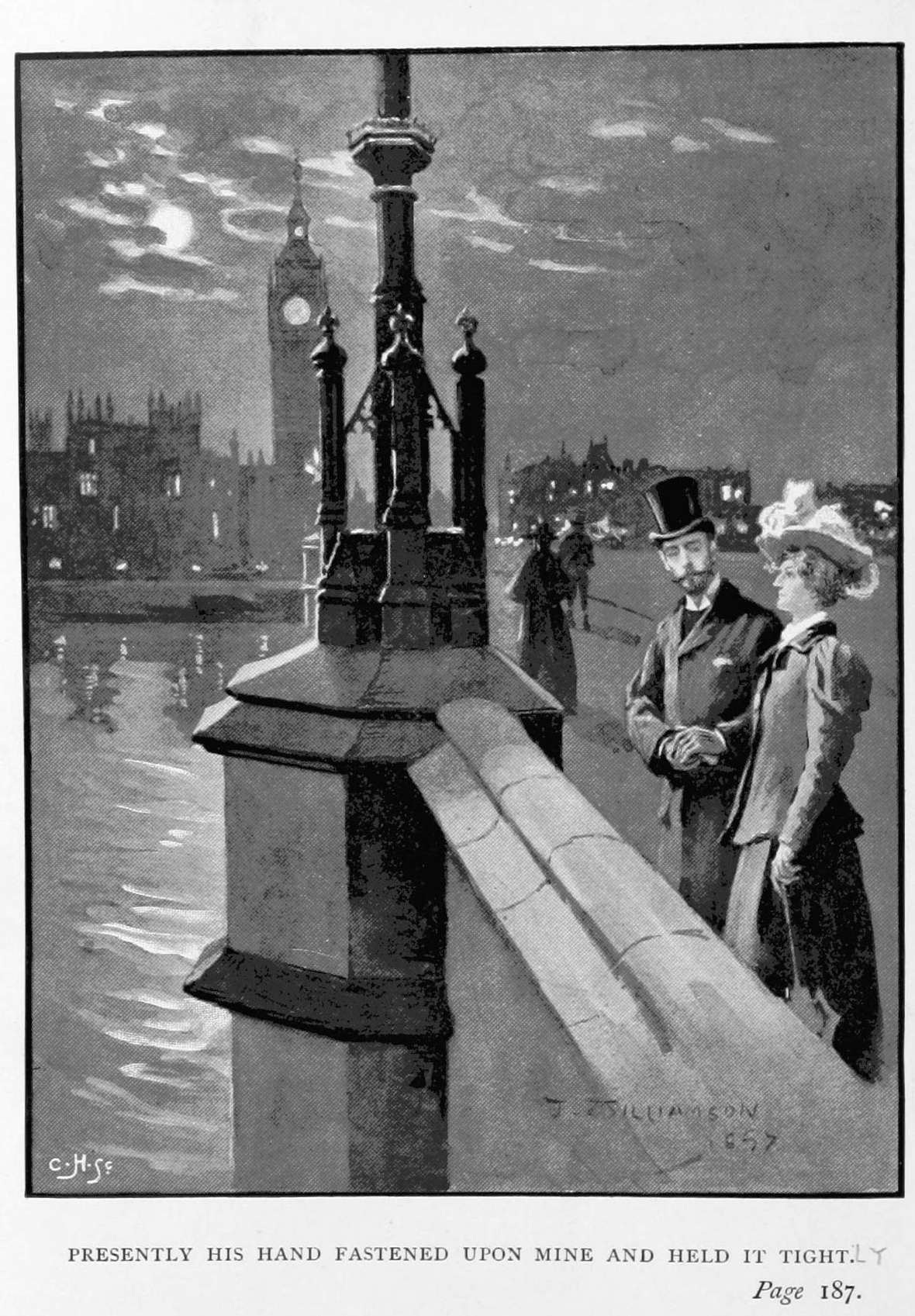
Page-187

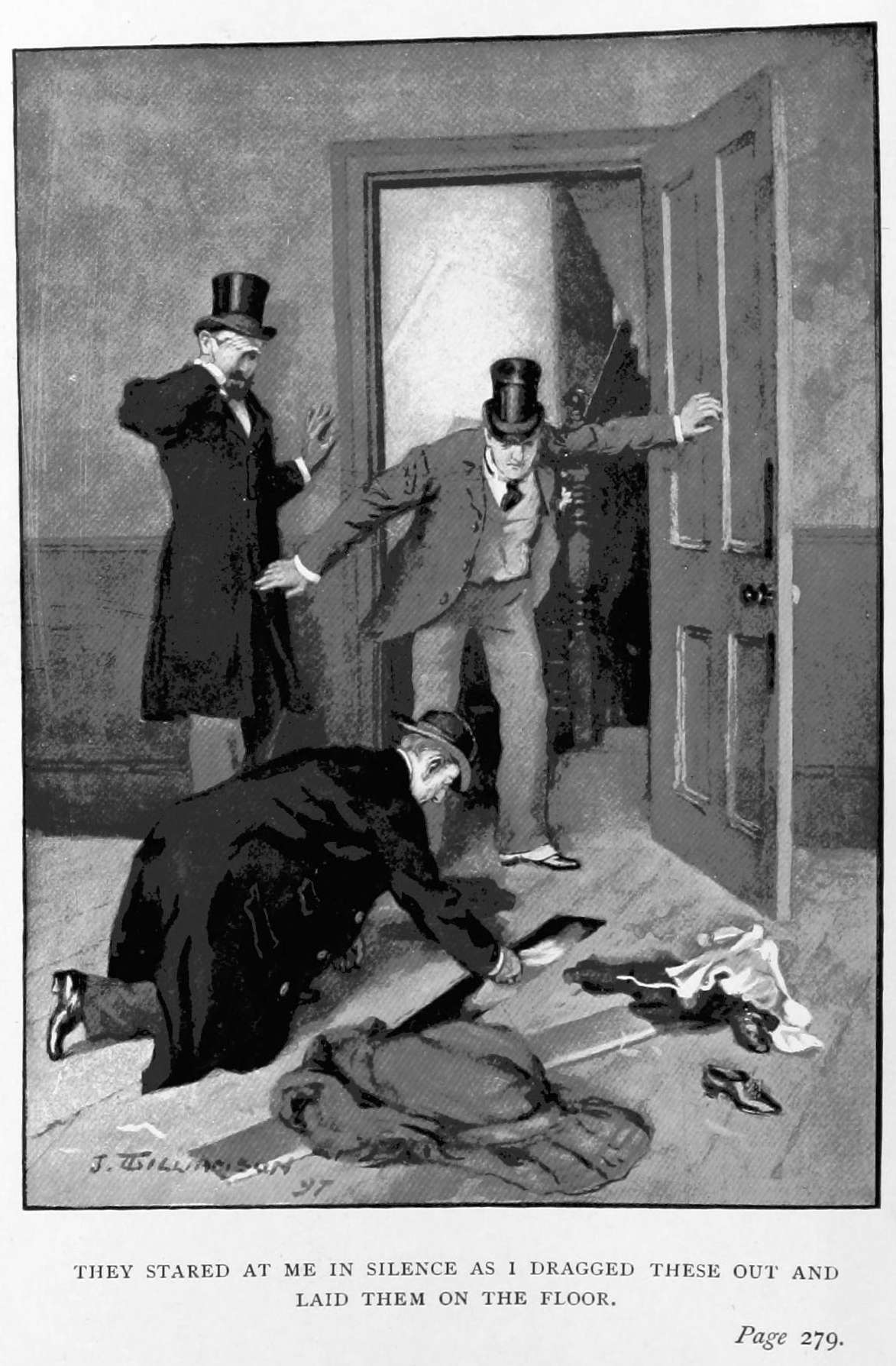
Page-279

=== Other novels ===
In addition to The Beetle, Marsh had several other successes in the genre of horror. Particularly notable among these are The Goddess: A Demon (1900), in which an Indian sacrificial idol comes to life with murderous intent, and The Joss: A Reversion (1901), in which an Englishman transforms himself into a hideous oriental idol. An important element of many of Marsh's novels, including The Beetle, is investigation of mystery, and several of his novels concern crime and its detection. In the novel Philip Bennion's Death (1897) a bachelor is discovered dead the day after discussing Thomas De Quincey's essay on murder as a fine art, and his neighbour and friend begins investigating the mystery. In The Datchet Diamonds (1898) a young man who has lost his fortune by the stock market accidentally swaps bags with a diamond thief, only then to find himself pursued by both the robbers and the police.

Marsh blends crime with science fiction in A Spoiler of Men (1905), the gentleman-criminal villain of which renders people slaves to his will by means of a chemical injection. Despite his success with popular fiction, Marsh seems also to have aspired to serious literary production, and his novel A Second Coming (1900) imagines Christ's return to an early-20th century London. Current scholarly research describes Marsh as a writer with a good sense of the literary market but who often transcended the ideological and aesthetic boundaries that his contemporaries established.

=== Short fiction ===
Marsh was also adept in the genre of short stories, publishing in literary periodicals such as Household Words, Cornhill Magazine, The Strand Magazine, and Belgravia, as well as in a number of book collections. The stories The Seen and the Unseen (1900), Marvels and Mysteries (1900), Both Sides of the Veil (1901) and Between the Dark and the Daylight (1902) (illustrated by Oscar Wilson) all feature an eclectic mix of humour, crime, romance and the occult. The Death Whistle (1903) features an unfairly convicted man seeking revenge, drawing on Marsh's experience of prison life.

He also published serial short stories, developing characters whose adventures could be related in discrete stories in numerous editions of a magazine. Mr. Pugh and Mr. Tress of Curios (1898) are rival collectors between whom pass a series of bizarre and discomfiting objects – poisoned rings, pipes which seem to come to life, a phonograph record on which a murdered woman seems to speak from the dead, and the severed hand of a 13th-century aristocrat. One of Marsh's most striking creations is Miss Judith Lee, a young teacher of deaf pupils whose lip-reading ability involves her with mysteries that she solves by acting as a detective. Another popular creation was Sam Briggs, whose fictional escapades as a young office clerk, and later as a soldier of World War I, were published by the magazine The Strand during the early 20th century.

== Selected works ==
- Daintree (1893)
- The Mahatma's Pupil (1893)
- The Devil's Diamond (1893)
- Mrs Musgrave and Her Husband (1895)
- The Beetle (1897)
- Crime and the Criminal (1897)
- The Duke and the Damsel (1897)
- The Mystery of Philip Bennion's Death (1897)
- The Datchet Diamonds (1898)
- The House of Mystery (1898)
- Curios: Some Strange Adventures of Two Bachelors (1898)
- A Second Coming (1900)
- The Goddess: A Demon (1900)
- The Seen and the Unseen (1900)
- Marvels and Mysteries (1900)
- Ada Vernham: Actress (1900) (Note: The book was originally due to be published by John Long in September 1898. However, it was represented that some of the content might be objectionable, and Marsh undertook to revise the book for publication in January 1899. However it was two years before the book was ready and it was published in May 1900, with the advance orders completely consuming the first edition. A second edition ready for sale on 28 May 1900.) The book was illustrated with a frontispiece by Oscar Wilson.
- The Joss: A Reversion (1901)
- The Twickenham Peerage (1902)
- The Magnetic Girl (1903)
- The Death Whistle (1903)
- Miss Arnott's Marriage (1903)
- The Confessions of a Young Lady: Her Doings and Misdoings (1905)
- A Spoiler of Men (1905)
- A Duel (1905)
- The Coward Behind the Curtain (1908)
- That Master of Ours (1908)
- Sam Briggs: His Book (1912)
- Judith Lee: Some Pages from Her Life (1912)
- The Adventures of Judith Lee (1916)
- Sam Briggs, V.C (1916)
- Violet Forster's Lover (1916)
- The Deacon's Daughter (1917)
- On the Jury (1918)
- The Master of Deception (1918)
