= The Beetle (film) =

1919 British film by Alexander Butler

- Directed by: Alexander Butler
- Written by: Richard Marsh (novel); Helen Blizzard
- Produced by: Jack W. Smith
- Starring: Leal Douglas; Maudie Dunham; Hebden Foster; Fred Morgan
- Production company: Barker Films
- Distributed by: Urban Trading Company
- Release date: November 1919
- Running time: 62 minutes
- Country: United Kingdom
- Languages: Silent; English intertitles

The Beetle is a 1919 British silent horror film directed by Alexander Butler and starring Leal Douglas, Maudie Dunham, Hebden Foster and Fred Morgan. It was based on the 1897 novel The Beetle: A Mystery by Richard Marsh.

The 1897 novel went into print a few months after Bram Stoker's Dracula hit bookshelves, and it outsold Dracula at the time. It has since passed into relative obscurity, although it seems to have served as Stoker's inspiration for his 1903 The Jewel of Seven Stars, which also involved an ancient Egyptian princess reincarnating into the body of a modern-day woman. Director Alexander Butler went on to an acting role in the similarly themed 1925 film She.

Jonathan Rigby has called Leal Douglas’s High Priestess “the polymorphous title role”.

== Plot ==
An Ancient Egyptian princess (Leal Douglas) transforms herself into a beetle in order to gain revenge on Paul Lessingham, a British Member of Parliament. The creature can change its form, appearing as a man, a woman or a beetle. Lessingham seeks the aid of another man, who is a rival for the affections of a young woman they love, to aid him in his fight against the supernatural being that is haunting him.

== Cast ==
- Leal Douglas as High Priestess
- Maudie Dunham as Dora Greyling
- Hebden Foster as Paul Lessingham
- Fred Morgan as Neces
- Frank Reade as Sidney Atherton
- Rolf Leslie as Holt
- Nancy Kenyon as Marjorie Lindon

== Bibliography ==
- Low, Rachael. History of the British Film, 1918-1929. George Allen & Unwin, 1971.
- Rigby, Jonathan. English Gothic: A Century of Horror Cinema. Reynolds & Hearn, 2004.
