= Fin de siècle =

Late 19th-century European cultural phenomenon

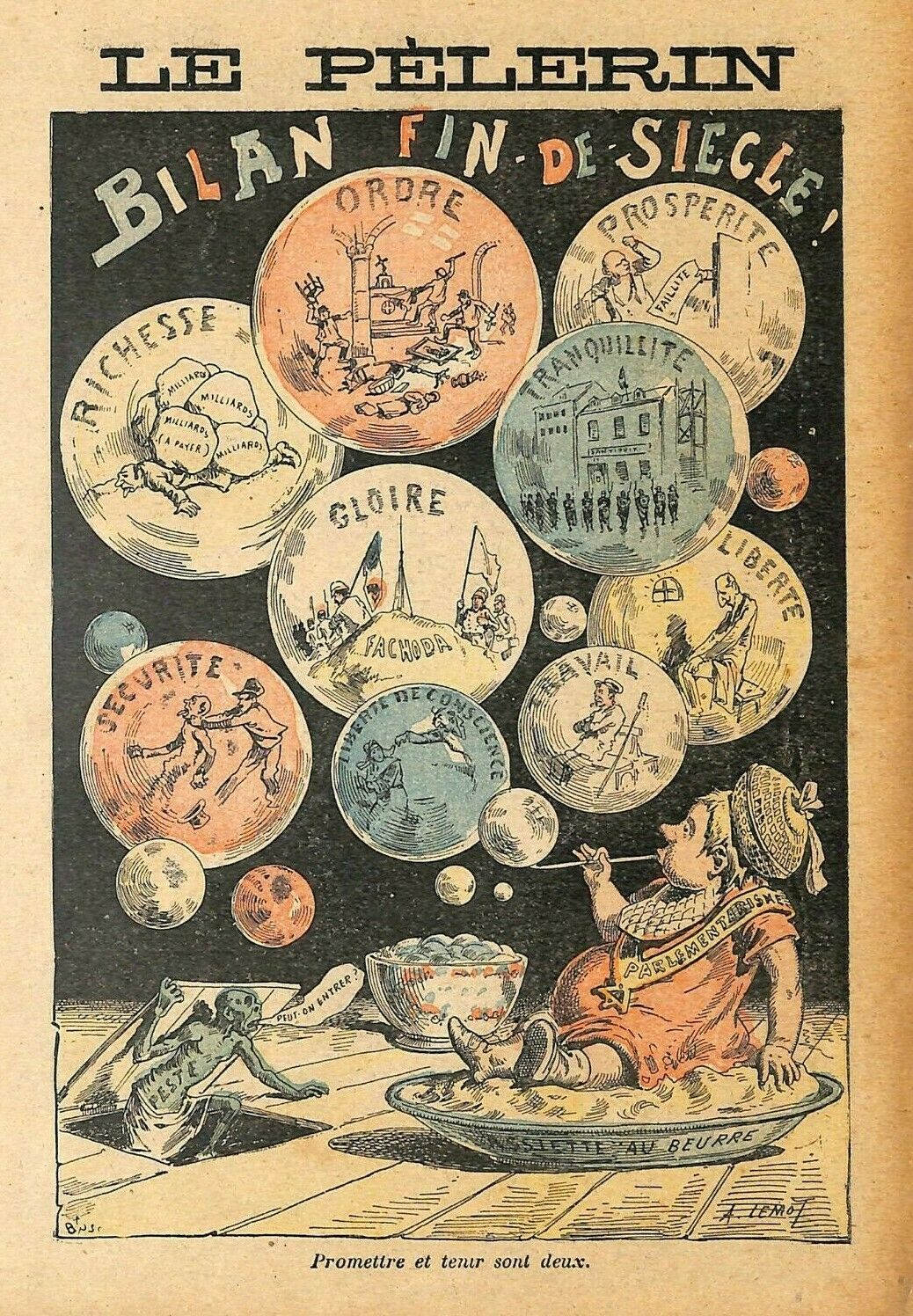
"Bilan fin-de-siècle! Promising and keeping are two", anti-republican caricature by Achille Lemot, from newspaper Le Pèlerin (1900)

"Fin de siècle" (French: [fɛ̃ d(ə) sjɛkl]) is a French term meaning 'end of century', a phrase which typically encompasses both the meaning of the similar English idiom turn of the century and also makes reference to the closing of one era and onset of another. Without context, the term is typically used to refer to the end of the 19th century. This period was widely thought to be a period of social degeneracy, but at the same time a period of hope for a new beginning. The "spirit" of fin de siècle often refers to the cultural hallmarks that were recognized as prominent in the 1880s and 1890s, including ennui, cynicism, pessimism, and "a widespread belief that civilization leads to decadence."

The term fin de siècle is commonly applied to French art and artists, as the traits of the culture first appeared there, but the movement affected many European countries. The term becomes applicable to the sentiments and traits associated with the culture, as opposed to focusing solely on the movement's initial recognition in France. The ideas and concerns developed by fin de siècle artists provided the impetus for movements such as symbolism and modernism.

The themes of fin de siècle political culture were very controversial and have been cited as a major influence on fascism and as a generator of the science of geopolitics, including the theory of Lebensraum. Professor of Historical Geography at the University of Nottingham, Michael Heffernan, and Mackubin Thomas Owens wrote about the origins of geopolitics:

The idea that this project required a new name in 1899 reflected a widespread belief that the changes taking place in the global economic and political system were seismically important.

The "new world of the twentieth century would need to be understood in its entirety, as an integrated global whole." Technology and global communication made the world "smaller" and turned it into a single system; the time was characterized by pan-ideas and a utopian "one-worldism", proceeding further than pan-ideas.

What we now think of geopolitics had its origins in fin de siècle Europe in response to technological change ... and the creation of a "closed political system" as European imperialist competition extinguished the world's "frontiers".

The major political theme of the era was that of revolt against materialism, rationalism, positivism, bourgeois society, and liberal democracy. The fin de siècle generation supported emotionalism, irrationalism, subjectivism, and vitalism, while the mindset of the age saw civilization as being in a crisis that required a massive and total solution.

== Fin de siècle syndrome ==
Michael Heffernan in his article "Fin de Siècle, Fin du Monde?" [End of the century, end of the world?] (2000) finds in the Christian world what he calls "the syndrome of fin de siècle". In 2000, this took the form of the Year 2000 problem. Fins de siècle are accompanied by future expectations:

Changes which are actually taking place at these junctures tend to acquire extra (sometimes mystical) layers of meaning. This was certainly the case in the 1890s, a decade of "semiotic arousal" when everything, it seemed, was a sign, a harbinger of some future radical disjuncture or cataclysmic upheaval ... The original French expression, meaning simply 'end of century', became a catch all phrase to describe everything from the architectural and artistic styles ... to the wider, often impassioned debates about the past, the present and the future on the eve of a new century. ... Much fin-de-siècle writing ... tended to assume that the passing of the nineteenth century would represent a fundamental historical discontinuity, a clear break with the past.

== Degeneration theory ==
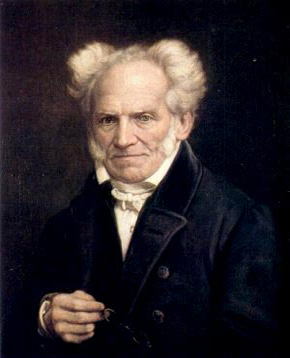
Arthur Schopenhauer, German philosopher, whose philosophy influenced the culture of fin de siècle

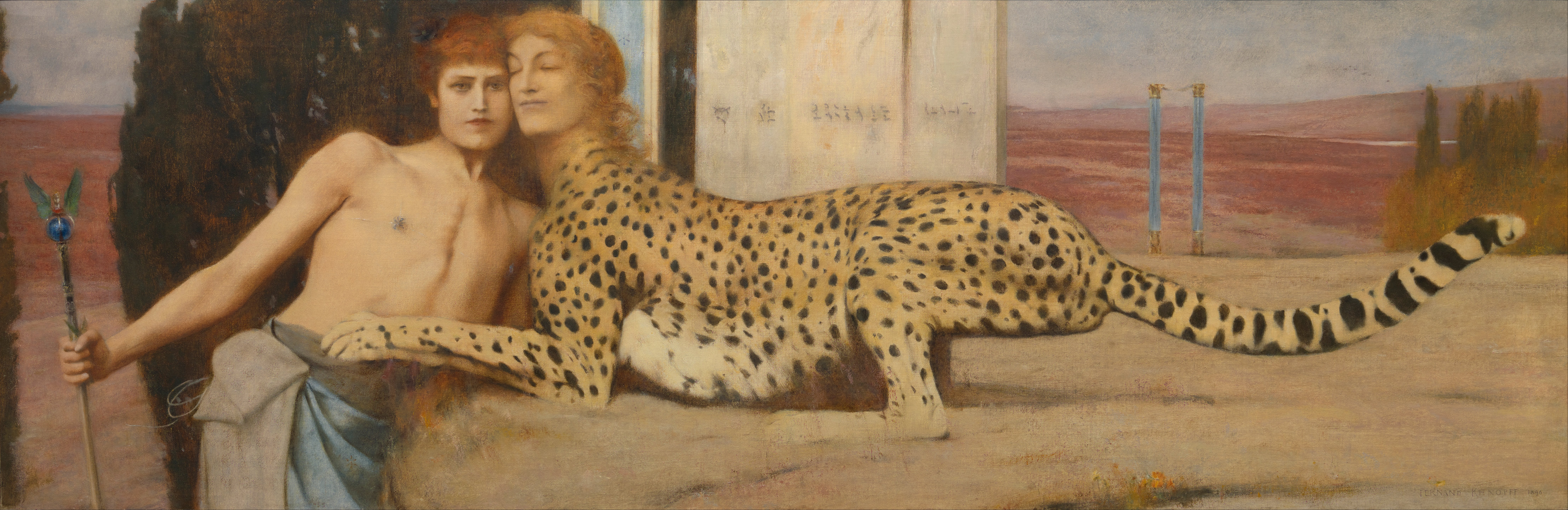
The Belgian symbolist Fernand Khnopff's The Caress

B. A. Morel's degeneration theory was a theory that held that although societies can progress, they can also remain static or even regress if influenced by a flawed environment, such as national conditions or outside cultural influences. This degeneration was described as being passed from generation to generation, resulting in imbecility and senility due to hereditary influence. Max Nordau's Degeneration held that the two dominant traits of those degenerated in a society involve ego mania and mysticism. The former term was understood to mean a pathological degree of self-absorption and unreasonable attention to one's own sentiments and activities, as can be seen in the extremely descriptive nature of minute details; the latter referred to the impaired ability to translate primary perceptions into fully developed ideas, largely noted in symbolist works. Nordau's treatment of these traits as degenerative qualities lends to the perception of a world falling into decay through fin de siècle corruptions of thought, and influencing the pessimism growing in Europe's philosophical consciousness. As fin de siècle citizens, attitudes tended toward science in an attempt to decipher the world in which they lived. The focus on psycho-physiology, now psychology, was a large part of fin de siècle society in that it studied a topic that could not be depicted through Romanticism, but relied on traits exhibited to suggest how the mind works, as does symbolism. The concept of genius returned to popular consciousness around this period through Max Nordau's work with degeneration, prompting study of artists supposedly affected by social degeneration and what separates imbecility from genius. The genius and the imbecile were determined to have largely similar character traits, including les delires des grandeurs and la folie du doute. The first, which means delusions of grandeur, begins with a disproportionate sense of importance in one's own activities and results in a sense of alienation, as Nordau describes in Baudelaire, as well as the second characteristic of madness of doubt, which involves intense indecision and extreme preoccupation with minute detail. The difference between degenerate genius and degenerate madman become the extensive knowledge held by the genius in a few areas paired with a belief in one's own superiority as a result. Together, these psychological traits lend to originality, eccentricity, and a sense of alienation, all symptoms of le mal du siècle (the evil of the century) that impacted French youth at the beginning of the 19th century until expanding outward and eventually influencing the rest of Europe approaching the turn of the century.

== Pessimism ==
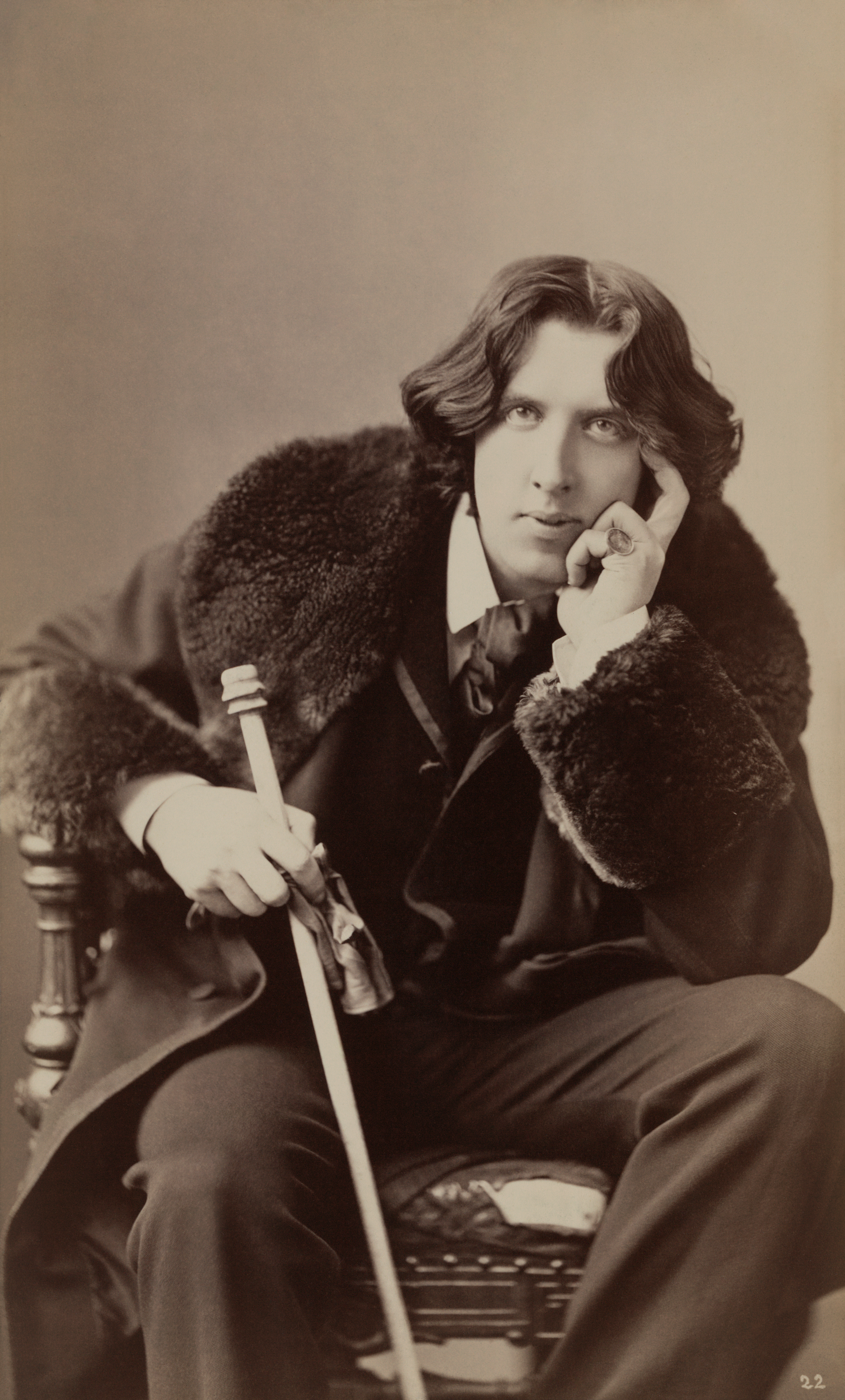
Irish Aesthetic writer Oscar Wilde

England's ideological space was affected by the philosophical waves of pessimism sweeping Europe, starting with philosopher Arthur Schopenhauer's work from before 1860 and gradually influencing artists internationally. R. H. Goodale identified 235 essays by British and American authors concerning pessimism, ranging from 1871 to 1900, showing the prominence of pessimism in conjunction with English ideology. Further, Oscar Wilde's references to pessimism in his works demonstrate the relevance of the ideology on the English. In An Ideal Husband, Wilde's protagonist asks another character whether "at heart, [she is] an optimist or a pessimist? Those seem to be the only two fashionable religions left to us nowadays." Wilde's reflection on personal philosophy as more culturally significant than religion lends credence to degeneration theory, as applied to Baudelaire's influence on other nations. However, the optimistic Romanticism popular earlier in the century would also have affected the shifting ideological landscape. The newly fashionable pessimism appears again in Wilde's The Importance of Being Earnest, written that same year:

Algernon: I hope tomorrow will be a fine day, Lane.
Lane: It never is, sir.
Algernon: Lane, you're a perfect pessimist.
Lane: I do my best to give satisfaction, sir.

Lane is philosophically current as of 1895, reining in his master's optimism about the weather by reminding Algernon of how the world typically operates. His pessimism gives satisfaction to Algernon; the perfect servant of a gentleman is one who is philosophically aware. Charles Baudelaire's work demonstrates some of the pessimism expected of the time, and his work with modernity exemplified the decadence and decay with which turn-of-the-century French art is associated, while his work with symbolism promoted the mysticism Nordau associated with fin de siècle artists. Baudelaire's pioneering translations of Edgar Allan Poe's verse supports the aesthetic role of translation in fin de siècle culture, while his own works influenced French and English artists through the use of modernity and symbolism. Baudelaire, Rimbaud, and their contemporaries became known as French decadents, a group that influenced its English counterpart, the aesthetes like Oscar Wilde. Both groups believed the purpose of art was to evoke an emotional response and demonstrate the beauty inherent in the unnatural as opposed to trying to teach its audience an infallible sense of morality.

== Literary conventions ==
In the Victorian fin de siècle, the themes of degeneration and anxiety are expressed not only through the physical landscape which provided a backdrop for Gothic Literature, but also through the human body itself. Works such as Robert Louis Stevenson's The Strange Case of Dr Jekyll and Mr Hyde (1886), Oscar Wilde's The Picture of Dorian Gray (1891), Arthur Machen's The Great God Pan (1894), H. G. Wells' The Time Machine (1895), Bram Stoker's Dracula (1897) and Richard Marsh's The Beetle (1897) all explore themes of change, development, evolution, mutation, corruption and decay in relation to the human body and mind. These literary conventions were a direct reflection of many evolutionary, scientific, social and medical theories and advancements that emerged toward the end of the 19th century.

Fin de siècle produced an avalanche of literature envisaging war. Future war narrative proved an instant success with the readers at all levels throughout Europe, becoming a staple of the European press. The most popular sold tens of thousands of copies, raced through multiple editions, and were translated into numerous foreign languages. From 1890, the tales of the war-to-come diversified in various ways. The popularity of the motif is not characteristic of every end of century. Rather it responded on the ever-growing concern and reflect the dominant expectations and assumptions of their day. Moreover, the future war scenarios were intended to act, and acted, as a powerful form of political advocacy. Duncan Bell explains the popularity of the genre by the collective fear peculiar to the time. He refers to many contemporary observers expressing mass anxiety, such as the Contemporary Review observing in 1876 that the "pulse of Europe is unquestionably beating rather quick."

== Artistic conventions ==
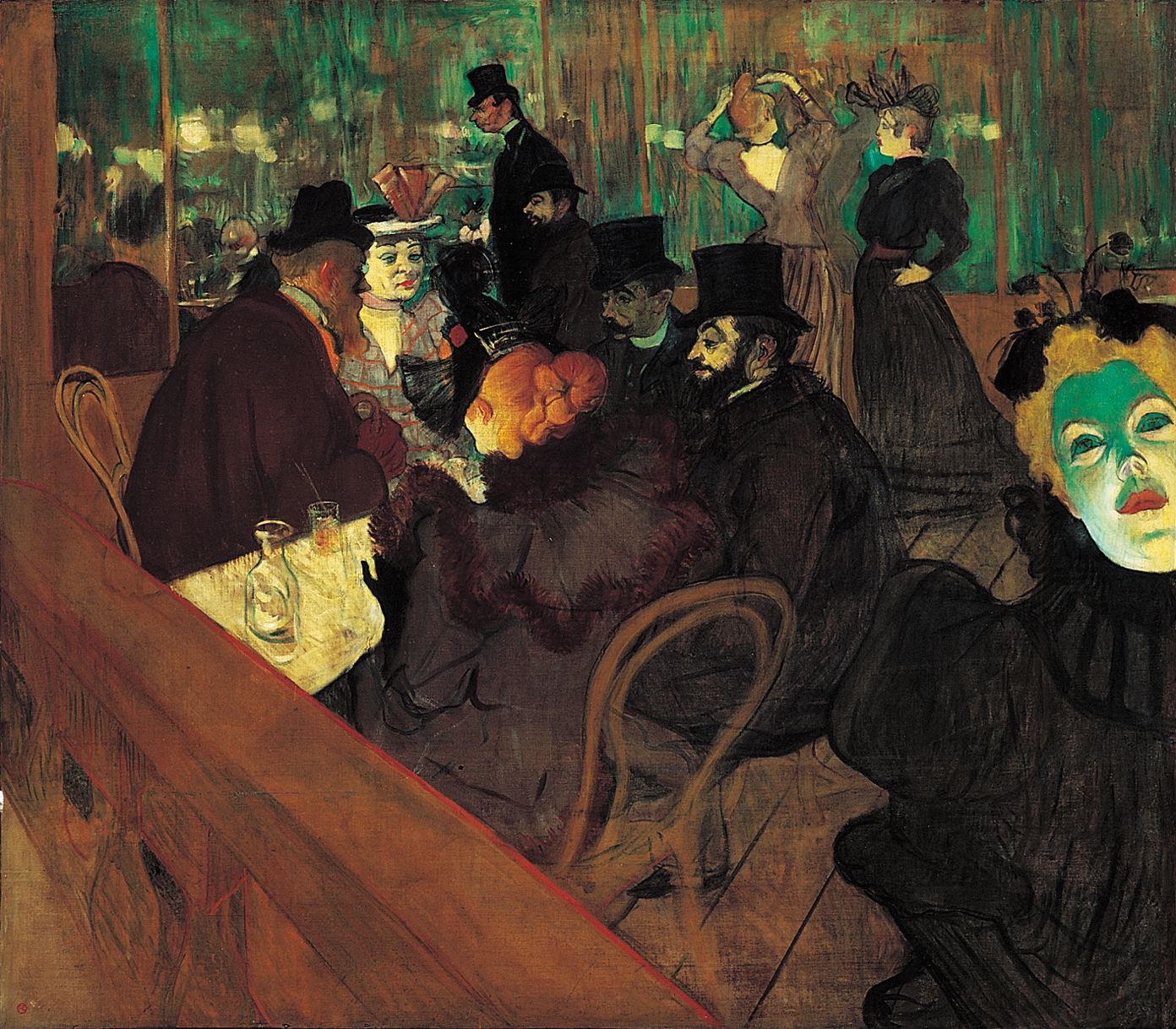
At the Moulin Rouge (1895), a painting by Henri Toulouse-Lautrec that captures the vibrant and decadent spirit of society during the fin de siècle

The works of the Decadents and the Aesthetes contain the hallmarks typical of fin de siècle art. Holbrook Jackson's The Eighteen Nineties describes the characteristics of English decadence, which are: perversity, artificiality, egoism, and curiosity. The first trait is the concern for the perverse, unclean, and unnatural. Romanticism encouraged audiences to view physical traits as indicative of one's inner self, whereas the fin de siècle artists accepted beauty as the basis of life, and so valued that which was not conventionally beautiful.

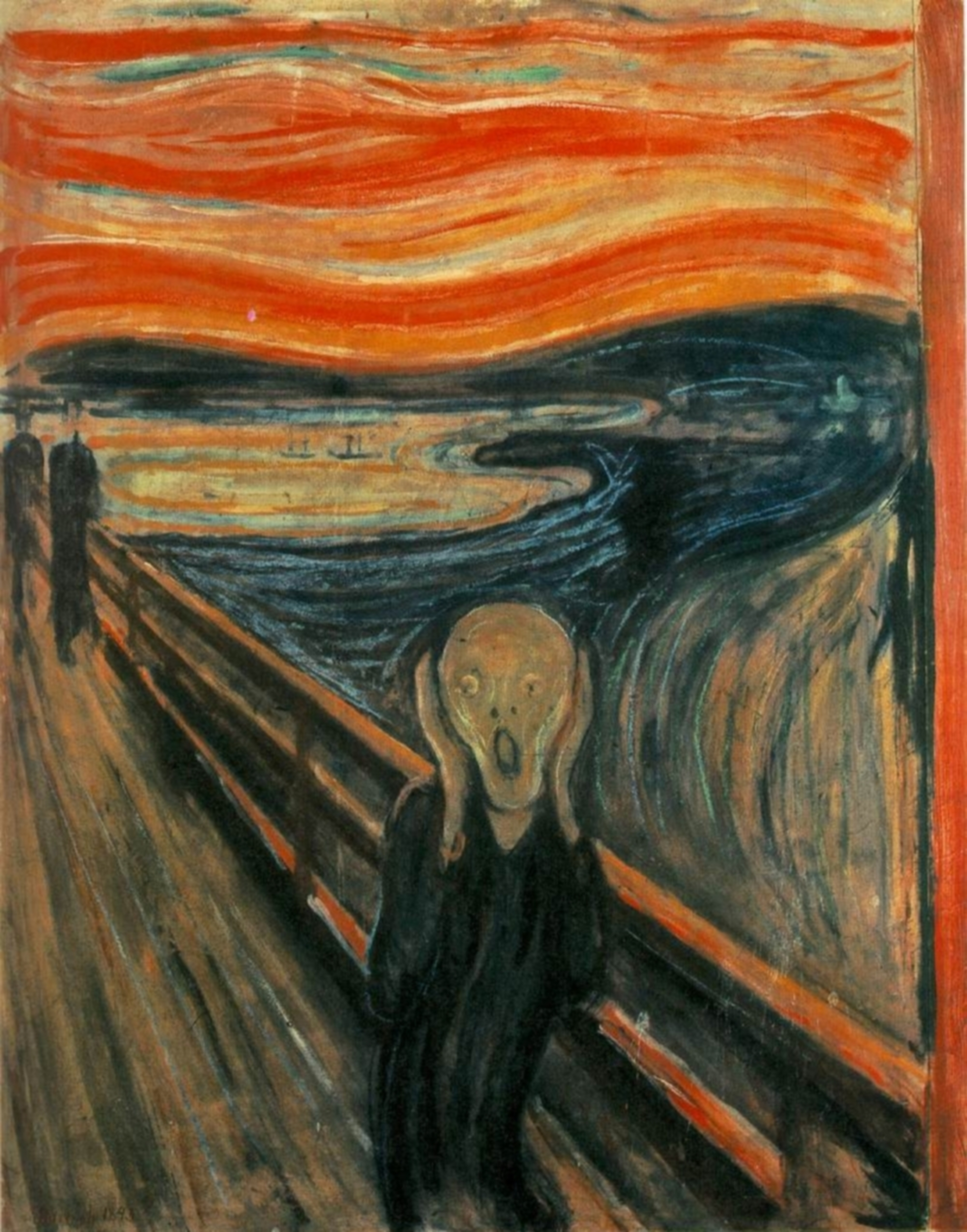
The Scream (1893), an expressionist painting by Edvard Munch, is a prominent cultural symbol of the fin de siècle era.

This belief in beauty in the abject leads to the obsession with artifice and symbolism, as artists rejected ineffable ideas of beauty in favour of the abstract. Through symbolism, aesthetes could evoke sentiments and ideas in their audience without relying on an infallible general understanding of the world.

The third trait of the culture is egoism, a term similar to that of "egomania", meaning disproportionate attention placed on one's own endeavours. This can result in a type of alienation and anguish, as in Baudelaire's case, and demonstrates how aesthetic artists chose cityscapes over country as a result of their aversion to the natural.

Finally, curiosity is identifiable through diabolism and the exploration of the evil or immoral, focusing on the morbid and macabre, but without imposing any moral lessons on the audience.

== See also ==
- Belle Époque
- Decadent movement
- Futurism
- Gay Nineties
- Lost Generation
- Symbolism (movement)
- Fin-de-siècle Vienna
- Fin-de-Siècle Museum
