= Bender tent =

Simple shelter of bent tree branches

A bender tent is a simple shelter. A bender tent is made using flexible branches or withies, such as those of hazel or willow. These are lodged in the ground, then bent and woven together to form a strong dome-shape. The dome is then covered using any tarpaulin available. These tents can be heated during the winter using a woodburning stove, and they are easily capable of withstanding very strong winds so long as the covers are well weighed down.

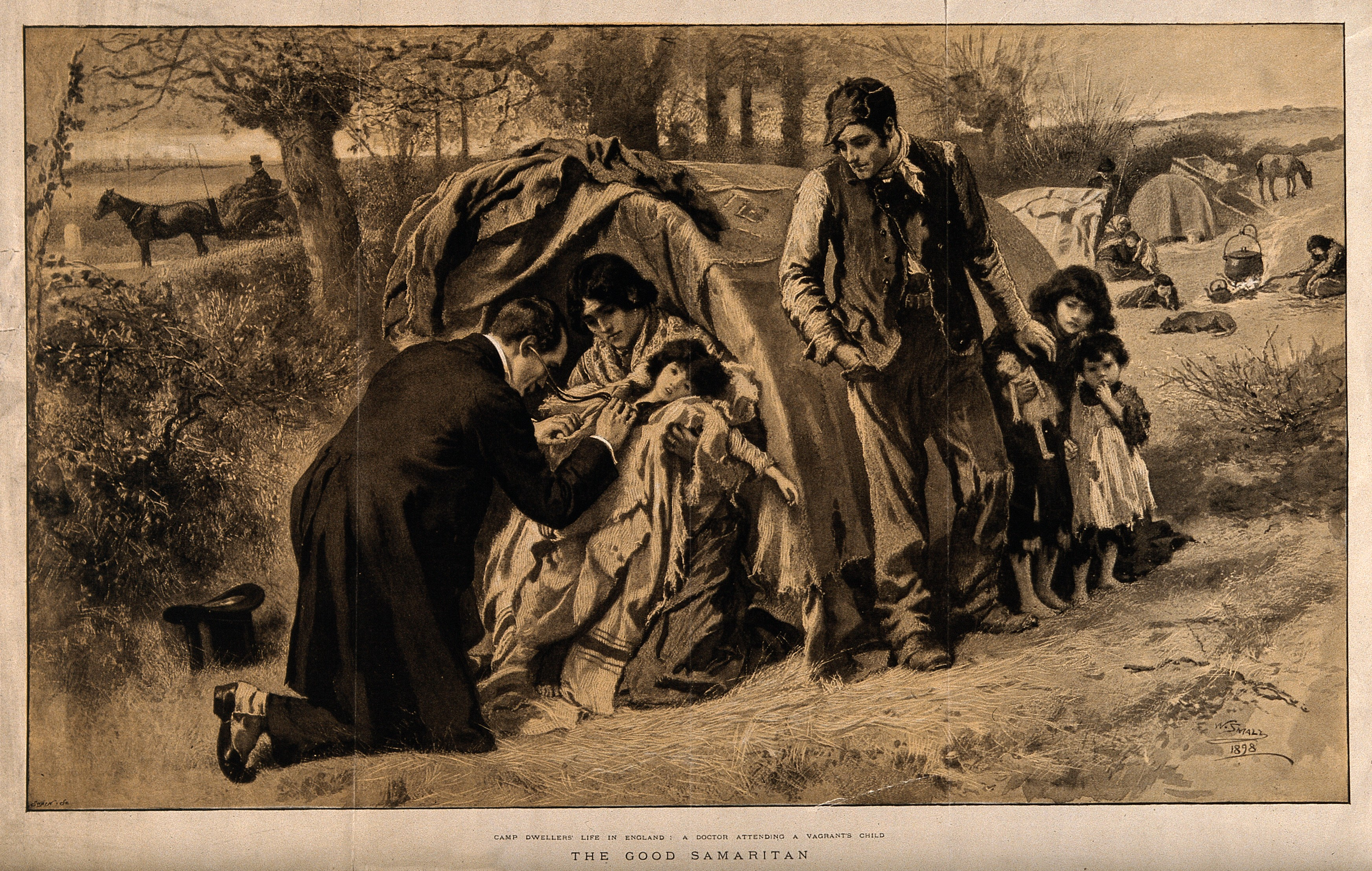
A doctor examining an English Traveller girl in a bender tent (Swain after W. Small, 1898.)

== Background ==
The origin of the bender cannot be ascribed to any particular ethnic group. The mat tents used by Tuareg nomads are very similar to them, and like structures are commonplace throughout sub-Saharan Africa. They were used by Romanies in Europe until very recently, and in the UK were revived for a while by New Age travellers.
