= Idyllic school =

19th-century group of British painters

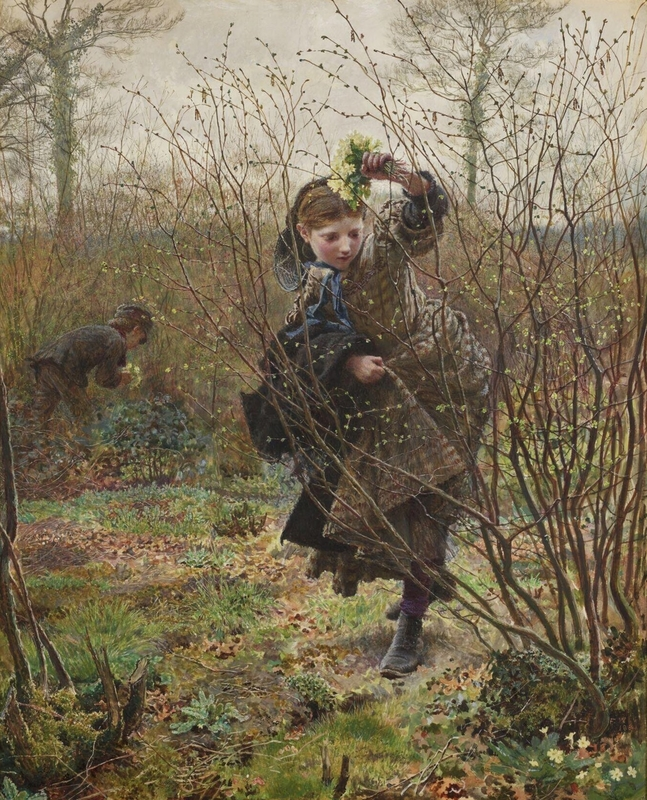
Spring, watercolour, 1864, now Frederick Walker's best-known painting, Victoria and Albert Museum

The Idyllic school (also known as the Idyllists) was a loose and informal group of British artists – not quite an art movement – in Victorian painting from about the early 1860s to the mid-1870s. Watercolour was typically their main medium, though several also painted in oils, and several also worked as illustrators in line drawings, which had an important bearing on their styles; their paintings were also often reproduced as prints. The indispensable core members of the group were Frederick Walker, John William North ARA RWS, and George John Pinwell RWS, all in their early twenties by 1864, but other artists are brought into discussions of the group, in a rather inconsistent fashion.

In 1871 a critic wrote in The Times "Mr. North and Mr. Macbeth both belong to the school of which in this country Mason and F. Walker are the chiefs, and Mr. Pinwell the lieutenant – the school which aims at making pictorial idylls out of the unpromising materials of lowly life in town and country".

By 1875 Walker, Pinwell, Mason and Houghton were all dead and the sense of a coherent group largely gone, after little more than a decade.

== Characteristics ==
Their subjects usually included figures, more prominently than in traditional British watercolour landscape painting, and are generally set in relatively restricted spaces, whether outside or in interiors. The wide panoramic views typical of many Victorian watercolourists of the day are rarely seen; many outdoor subjects are set in a garden with high walls; this can be seen as a reflection of their training as illustrators. West, North and Pinwell all met when training with the leading wood engraving artist Josiah Wood Whymper, and then later worked for the large firm The Brothers Dalziel. This usually involved producing monochrome drawings in ink, to be cut as wood engraving blocks by specialist cutters.

They adopted some of the precision and intense concentration on detail of the Pre-Raphaelites, but avoided their medieval settings, very strong colours, and reliance on subjects from literature; Pinwell was an exception to this last. Most of their pictures had contemporary settings in terms of costume, though buildings tended to be old and unpretentiously picturesque. They often have a balance between social realism and idealism, and a narrative interest in what the figures are doing or thinking, which arises purely from the painting rather than any source in literature. The members who survived to work in later decades, some into the next century, developed in various ways, including these directions.

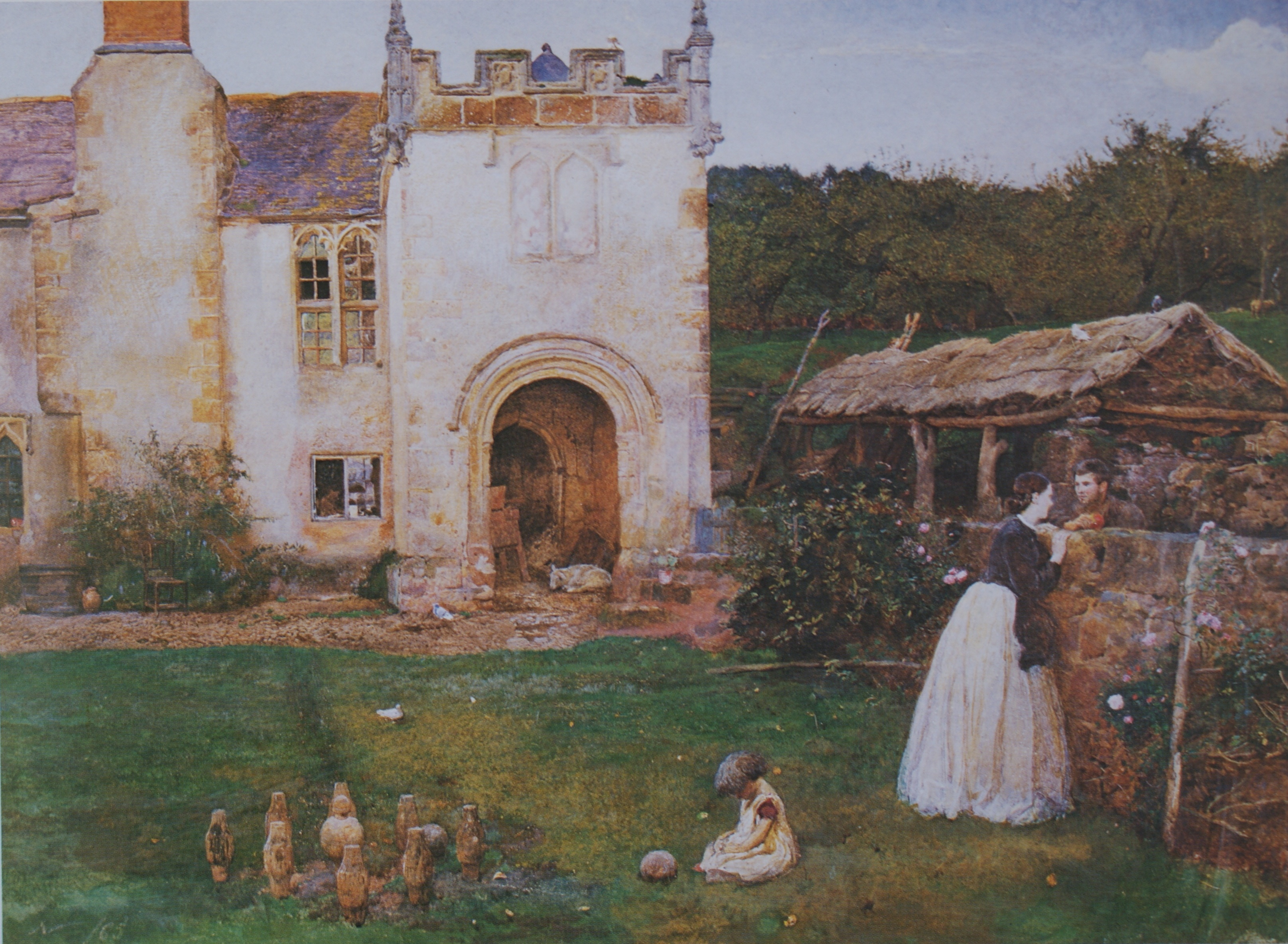
John William North, An Old Bowling Green (Halsway Manor, Somerset), 1865, watercolour, British Museum

Andrew Wilton saw the group as creating "a new breed of work in which the expresssive burden is shared more evenly between figures and background, and in which a deliberately 'psychological' atmosphere is aimed at". He says that they

often concentrate on concatenations of intensely observed detail rendered in colours that maintain a consistent tonality over the whole surface of the work. This, combined with their use of a thick, rather muddy bodycolour, gives rise to a flat dense atmospheric effect ...a quiet, flat, tonality ... distinctly of its time [which] creates a new aesthetic based on the juxtaposition of equal tones in a sort of twilight ... in which human drama may occur.

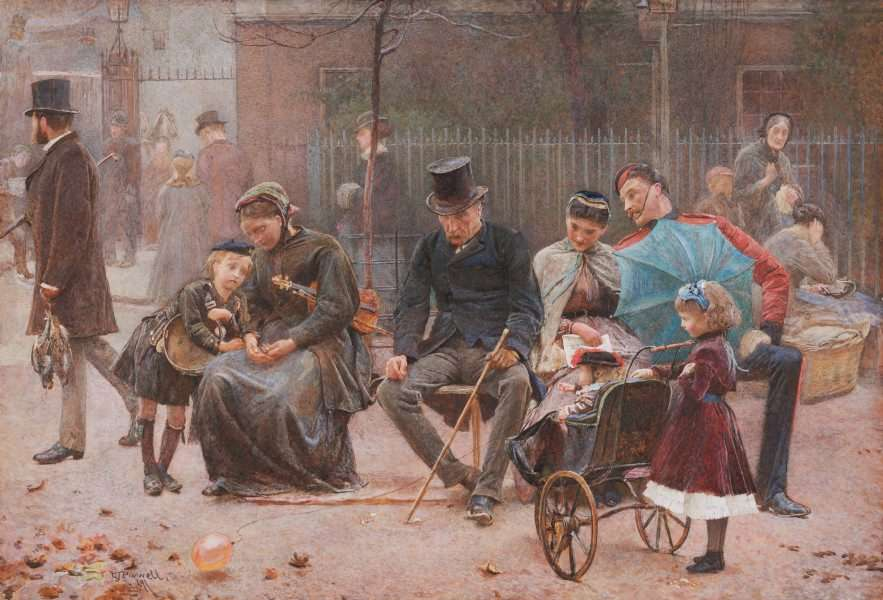
George John Pinwell, A Seat in St James's Park, 1869, watercolour and bodycolour, NSW Art Gallery, 41.9 x 60.2 cm

In this respect the group can be seen as looking forward to "the lush but subdued colour schemes of the Aesthetic Movement" and beyond, while also representing an early manifestation of the social realism movement in art.

The group avoided the more idealized and sentimental treatment of (mostly) rural and female figure subjects aleady developing in the hands of Myles Birket Foster RWS, 1825 – 1899, who was already well-established by the 1860s, and later continued by Helen Allingham RWS, 1848 – 1926, both like the Idyllists originally illustrators who then turned to watercolour. However these both knew West and respectively influenced, helped and were helped by him.

They also treated social issues, and themes such as human mortality, but in a less stark and despairing fashion than social realist artists, who were already prominent before the 1860s, both in printed illustrations and in oils, but less so in watercolour. The Mitherless Bairn (1855) by the Scottish painter Thomas Faed was a great success at the Royal Academy Summer Exhibition, one of a number of pictures on the theme of infidelity and unmarried mothers. The three paintings in Past and Present (1858) by Augustus Egg, Rossetti's Found (begun 1854) and GF Watts's Found Drowned (1858) are other examples. Watson summarizes the most common subjects as "fallen woman, the death of a child or breadwinner, hard work and emigration or the pathos of old age".

Those in the group who continued to work as illustrators reached a considerably wider audience than the public attending exhibitions, which were mainly in London, although the several watercolour shows organized by the societies were in this period well-attended and widely reviewed in the press. Van Gogh's well-known admiration for the group was shown in letters to his brother Theo, and in his collection of their work cut from contemporary British newspapers, such as the Illustrated London News and The Graphic.

== Names ==
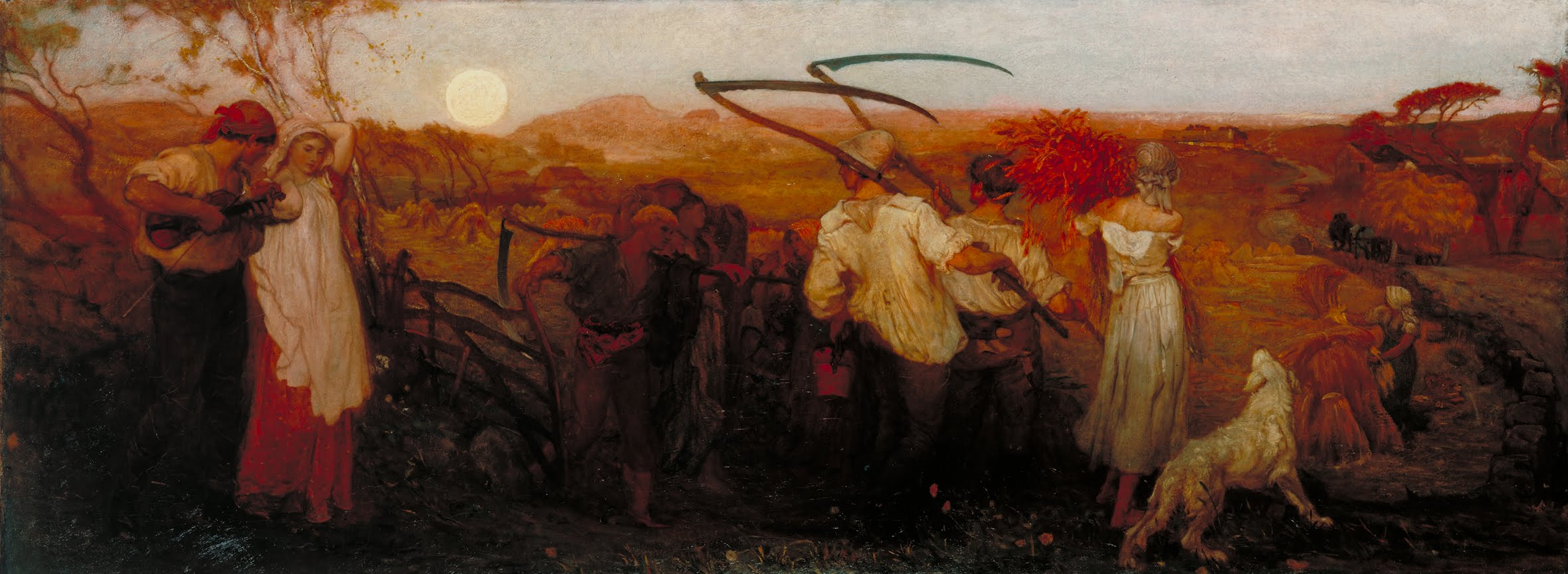
George Hemming Mason, The Harvest Moon, oils, 86 x 231 cm, 1872, Tate

The name Idyllists was only given to them in the 1890s by critics, after the group had mostly moved on to other styles, or died. The name seems to come from the book Idyllic Pictures (1867), an anthology of illustrations from The Quiver, each accompanied by a poem, many of which were published for the first time. The noun form "Idyllism" is very rarely found. The term, in whatever form, has not been found a necessary one by some historians; the standard histories of English watercolours by Martin Hardie and Graham Reynolds do not use it at all, despite discussing the principal figures. But recent books include it in their titles. Some art historians, such as Andrew Wilton, prefer to call the group "the illustrators", or a "school of draughtsman-illustrators", as Martin Hardie puts it.

== Idyllist painters ==
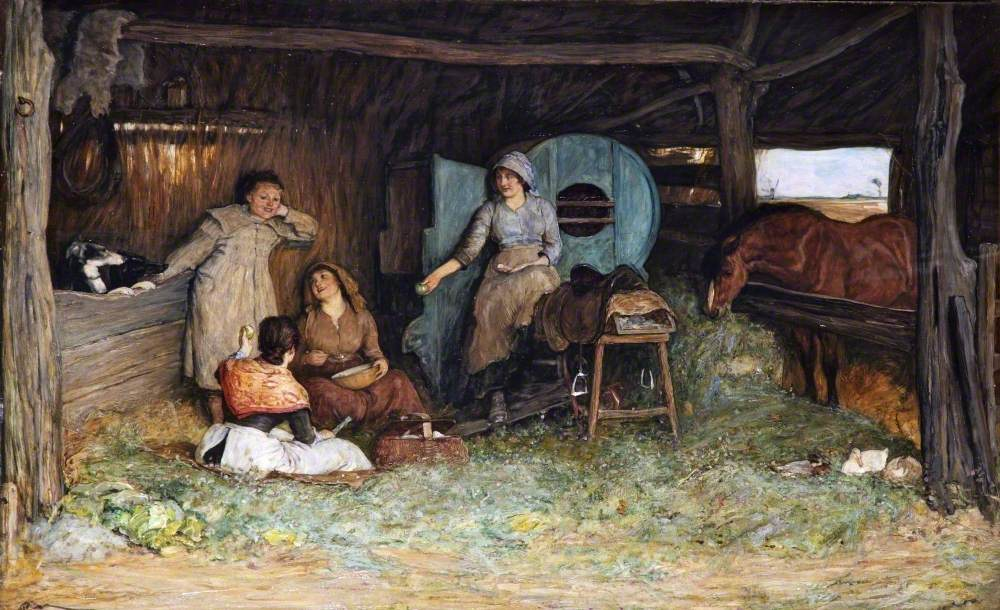
Robert Walker Macbeth, In Clover, 1879, oils, 54 x 87 cm, Walker Art Gallery

- Frederick Walker, 1840–1875
- John William North ARA RWS, 1842–1924. He later moved to paint pure landscapes, surviving some 50 years after other key figures.
- George John Pinwell RWS, 1842–1875. A friend of North, not greatly admired by West, despite North's efforts.
- Robert Walker Macbeth RA RWS, 1848–1910. As well as his own paintings, Macbeth produced reproductive prints of the paintings of the other main members.
- George Hemming Mason ARA, 1818–1872. A good deal older, but he spent 15 years in Italy before 1858. His major works were in oils.

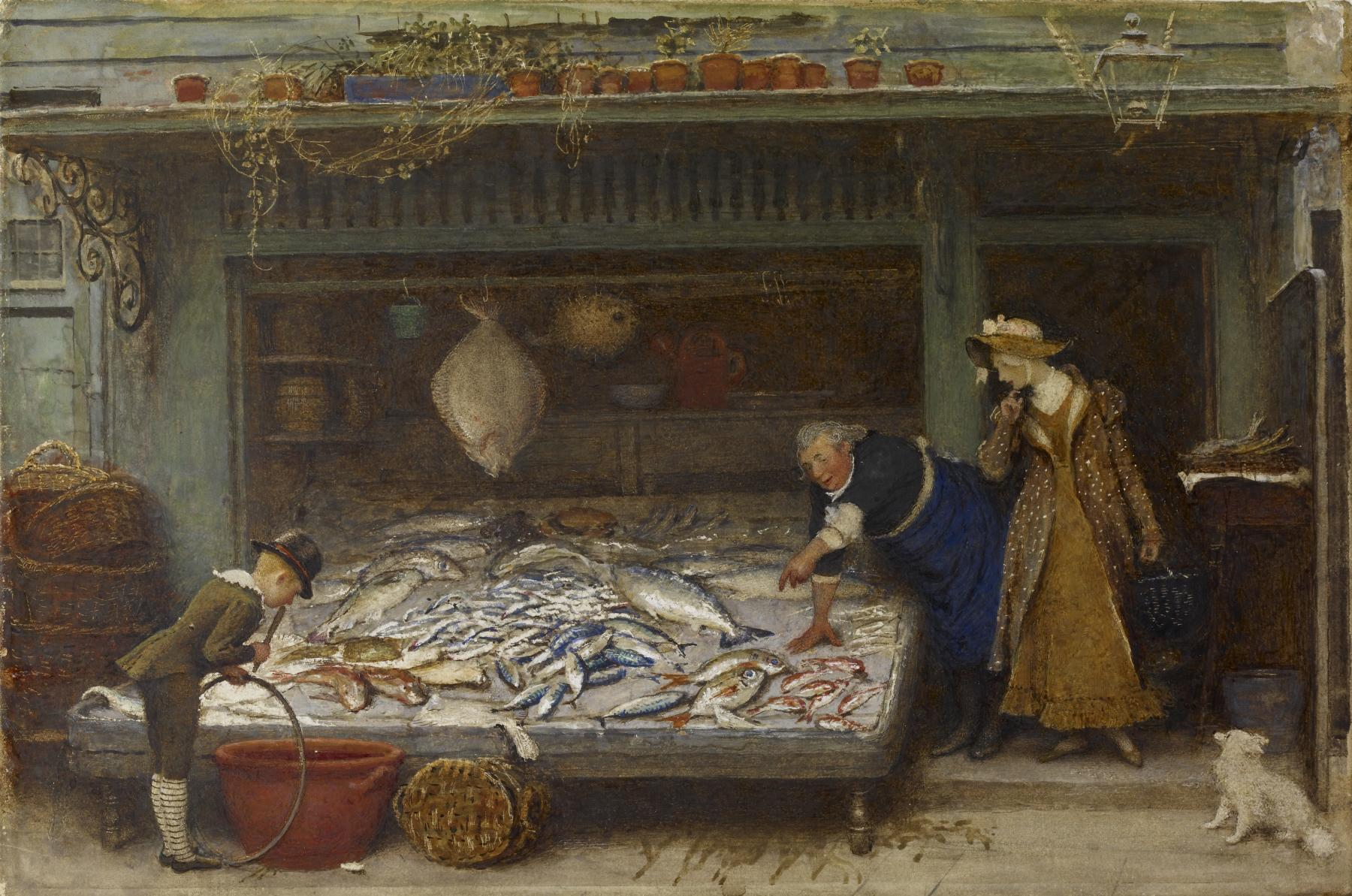
Fred Walker, A Fishmonger's Shop, repetition of 1873 watercolour, Walters Art Museum

Associated

- Cecil Gordon Lawson, 1849–1882, friend of the group but his distinctive landscapes in oils lacked the large figures characteristic of the group.
- Arthur Boyd Houghton 1836–1875, a brilliant and important illustrator; he also painted crowded street scenes and other subjects.
- Hubert von Herkomer RA, 1849–1914, connected with the group by interest in social realist painting, but never met West. As a student at the future Royal College of Art in 1866/67, on seeing West's The Bathers (1867) at the Royal Academy his memoirs record "it seemed a new direction, a new light...had appeared on the horizon".
- Richard Jefferies (writer), 1848–1887, a friend of North's from the 1880s.
- William Small, 1843–1929, a Scottish illustrator, in London from the 1860s, and painter in oils, often of rural social realist subjects.
- Lionel Smythe, 1839–1918 R.A. 1911, "linked with the school of Walker and North in thought, sentiment, and to some extent in method" says Hardie. A friend of North, his "outdoor figures are surrounded by shimmering light and air". Most are single figures of country girls in oils, latterly from Pas-de-Calais, where he lived.

== See also ==
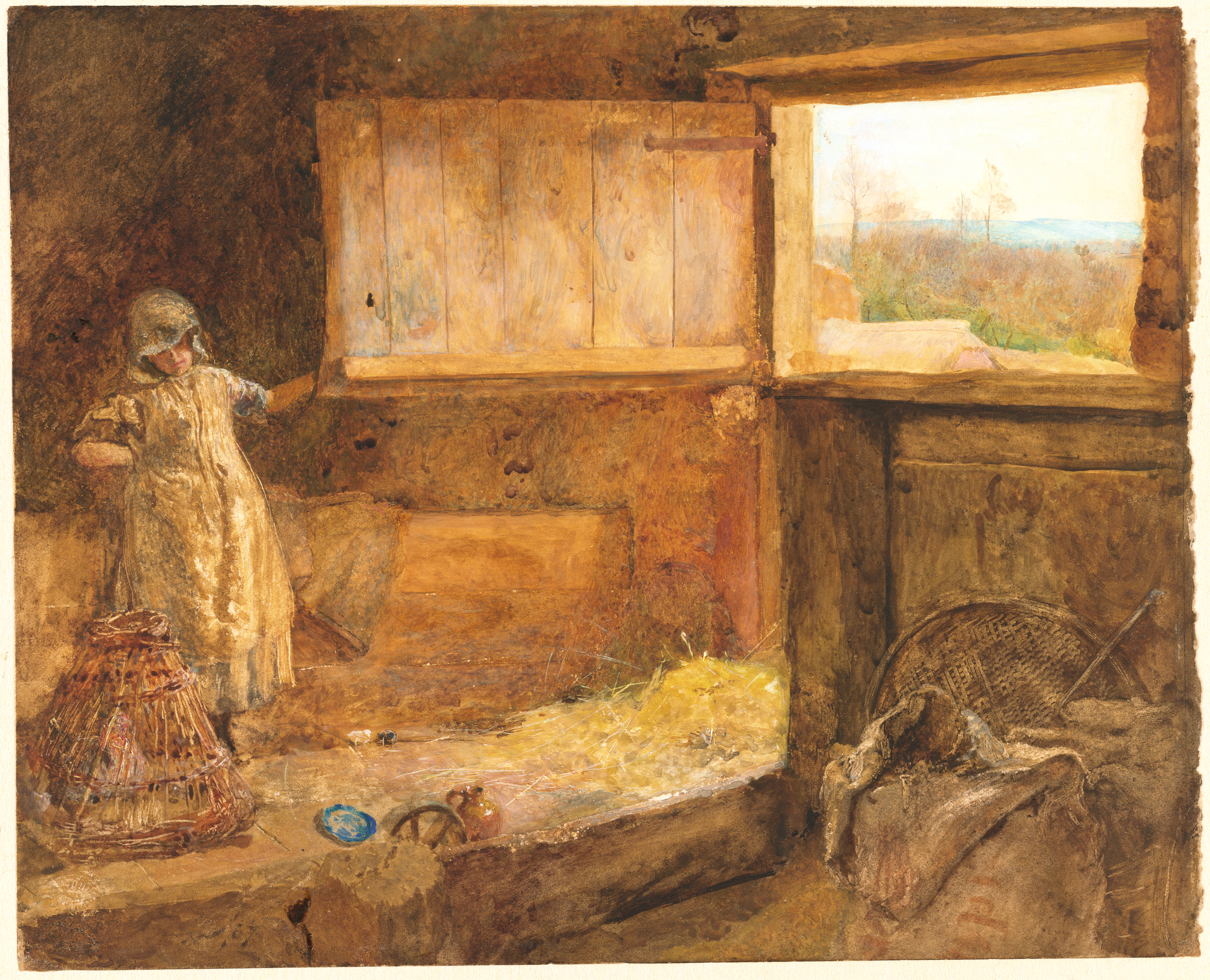
John William North, The Hayloft, 1867, NGA

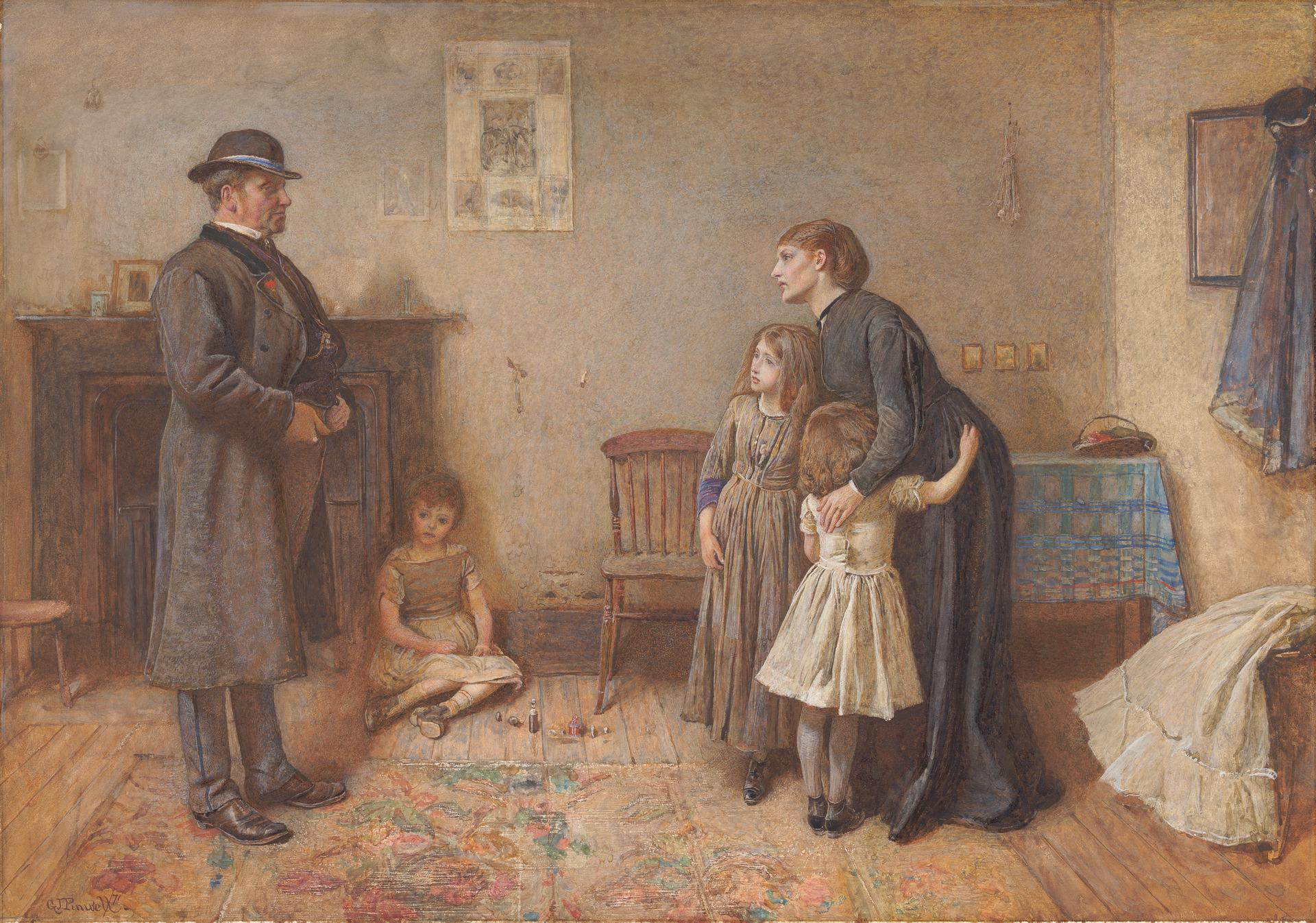
Pinwell, Landlord and Tenant, watercolour, 1871, Yale Center for British Art

- George Clausen
- Alice Mary Havers
