= Violet Guttenberg =

British novelist (1880–1973)

- Born: 26 April 1880; Chorlton-on-Medlock
- Died: 1973; Worthing
- Occupation: Writer
- Father: Marcus Guttenberg

Violet Leah Guttenberg (married name Allen, later Thompson-Allen; 26 April 1880 – 1973) was a British novelist.

Guttenberg was born on 26 April 1880 in Chorlton-on-Medlock, Manchester to Marcus Guttenberg, a photographer from Włocławek, and Henritta Guttenberg, who born in Rawicz. One of six siblings, Guttenberg was the younger sister of the photographer Percy Guttenberg. Educated at Manchester High School for Girls from 1886 and 1892, the family later moved to Willesden in 1892 where Guttenberg's father established a photography studio. In 1901, Guttenberg was baptised into the Church of England.

Guttenberg's work largely focused on British Jews but features evangelical themes and Jewish characters converting to Christianity. Scholars believe Guttenberg was raised Jewish before converting to Protestantism. In Neither Jew nor Greek (1902), Celia Franks is a Jewish woman who expresses distaste for Jewish social and religious customs and converts to Christianity. A Modern Exodus (1904) is a dystopian near future tale focused on Lionel Montella, a Jewish MP, who marries an Anglican woman, Lady Patricia. Thanks to the machinations of an antisemitic Prime Minister, an Expulsion Bill is passed to exile all Jews from the UK. Most Jews settle in Haifa, where Montella becomes governor. Guttenberg portrays Haifa as a place of religious intolerance and ethnic strife, and Montella is pitted against Chief Rabbi Ben-Yetzel, who forces Lady Patricia back to England because of her Anglicanism. The Prime Minister repents and most British Jews return to the UK.

She also published a novella, "Rabbi Phil" (1904), and a short story, "Twixt Beauty and Duty" (1908), in the evangelical publication The Quiver.

== Personal life ==
On 10 November 1904, Guttenberg married the brewer and wine merchant Thompson Allen (c. 1841–1912). The couple had two children including the organ builder Aubrey Thompson-Allen.

Guttenberg died in Worthing, Sussex in 1973.

== Bibliography ==
- Guttenberg, Violet (1902). Neither Jew nor Greek: A Story of Jewish Social Life. London: Chatto & Windus.
- Guttenberg, Violet (1903). The Power of the Palmist. London: Chatto & Windus.
- Guttenberg, Violet (1904). A Modern Exodus. London: Greening & Co.
