= Roland Arthur Charles North =

English colonial administrator

Roland Arthur Charles North CMG
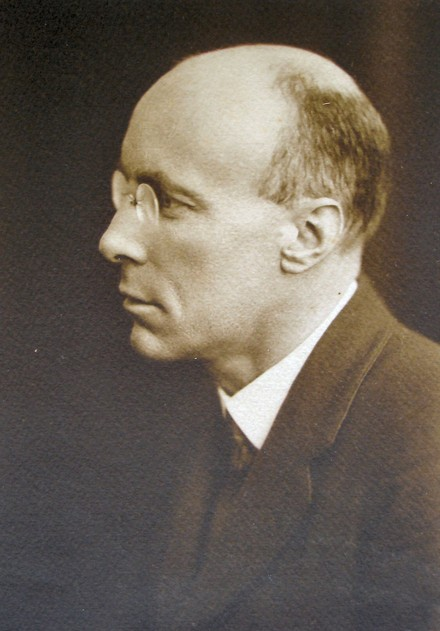

Secretary for Chinese Affairs
- In office 1936–1941
- Preceded by: Norman Lockhart Smith
- Succeeded by: Vacant

Personal details
- Born: 28 January 1889 Nettlecombe, Somerset
- Died: 18 June 1961 (aged 72) Katoomba, New South Wales

Roland Arthur Charles North, CMG (28 January 1889 – 18 June 1961) was an English colonial administrator. He was the Secretary for Chinese Affairs in the Hong Kong colonial government. He was interned at Stanley Camp during the Japanese occupation of Hong Kong.

North was born at Beggearnhuish House, Nettlecombe, Somerset, England on 28 January 1889 to artist John William North. He joined the civil service in 1912 and became Secretary for Chinese Affairs in Hong Kong in 1936 and served until the fall of Hong Kong. He had also acted as Colonial Secretary of Hong Kong and Officer Administering the Government in 1936.

North was interned at the Stanley Camp throughout the occupation. During the occupation, he asked the leading figures in the Chinese community, including Shouson Chow and Robert Kotewall to collaborate with the Japanese, "to take upon themselves what should have been my duty in working with the Japanese." The acceptance of these figures after the war caused public outrage. North was repatriated to England in October 1945. He arrived in Southampton on 9 November on the Royal Mail Lines ship Highland Monarch. He was subsequently awarded Companion of the Order of St Michael and St George in 1946.

In 1947, from Southampton on P&O's Strathmore on 4 March 1947 North moved to Australia and lived in Katoomba, New South Wales until he died in 1961, aged 72. After his death, his widow Leo (died 1976) and daughter, Philippa, returned to live in Somerset. Philippa died in 2005.

Government offices
Preceded by Norman Lockhart Smith	Secretary for Chinese Affairs; 1936–1941	Vacant Japanese occupation of Hong Kong
