= A Seat in St James's Park =

Painting by George John Pinwell

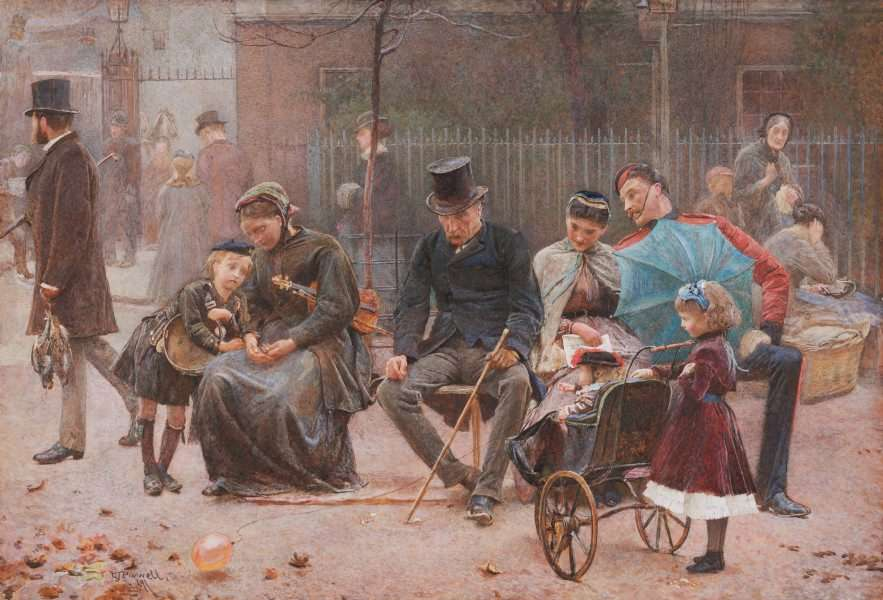
- Artist: George John Pinwell
- Year: 1869
- Medium: Watercolour
- Dimensions: 41.9 cm × 60.2 cm (16.5 in × 23.7 in)
- Location: Art Gallery of New South Wales, Sydney

A Seat in St James's Park is an 1869 watercolour painting by English painter George John Pinwell.

== History and description ==
The painting is an early exhibition work by Pinwell, a key figure of the Idyllic school. It is a watercolour and gouache study of a print he had produced for Once a Week. The painting was exhibited and favourably received at the Royal Watercolour Society's summer exhibition of 1869, the same year he was elected an associate member of the society. The Pall Mall Gazette praised the paintings and noted the inspiration from Idyllist Frederick Walker. A larger block print of the painting was produced, likely intended for The Graphic, but possibly due to damage to the blocks it was never printed. The acclaim the work received helped Pinwell become a full member two years after. In 1886 the painting was bought by the Gallery of New South Wales, secured for their small but growing collection of British art, in which it remains today.

The painting depicts a scene in St James's Park in London. It centres on a group of people sitting on a bench, including a soldier talking to a nursemaid, an elderly man with a cane and top hat, and a mother and son musician. Also depicted are a young girl with a toddler in a pram and various people walking about.

== Bibliography ==
- Esposito, Donato (2017). Frederick Walker and the Idyllists. London: Lund Humphries. ISBN 978-1-84822-162-8.
