= John William North =

English painter (1842–1924)

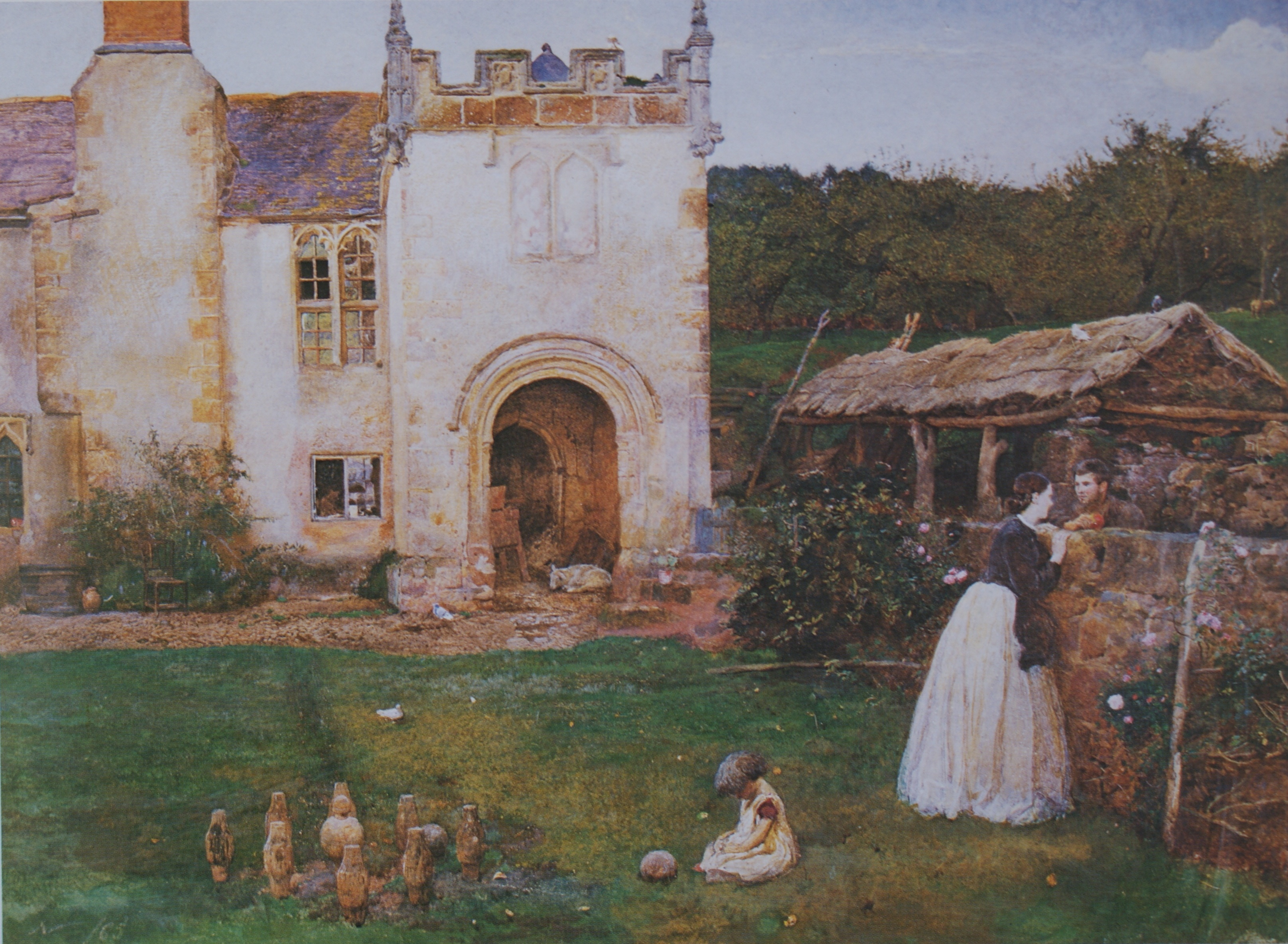
An Old Bowling Green (Halsway Manor, Somerset) (1865). Watercolour, British Museum

John William North ARA RWS (London 1 January 1842 – 20 December 1924 Stamborough, Somerset) was a British landscape painter, mainly in watercolour, and illustrator, a prominent member of the Idyllists.

== Biography ==
The Wood Gatherers, watercolour, 1869, Cleveland Museum of Art

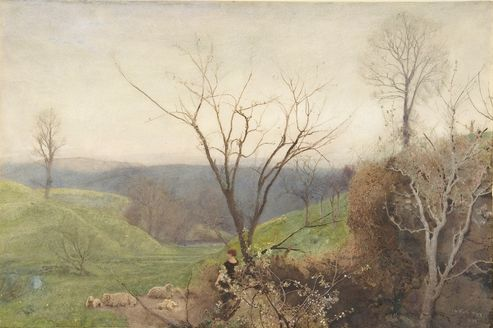
Spring, watercolour, Metropolitan Museum of Art, New York.

North was born in Walham Green in London, England. His father Charles North was a draper who together with his wife Fanny kept a shop in the area. They had three children apart from John – Charles, Fanny and Alfred. Little is known of John's early schooling, although he claimed to have been an avid reader from the age of 6 years. He left school at the age of 12.

Due to a downturn in business, John's father was forced to shut up shop and relocate the business to Worthing (on the Sussex coast). After the business failed again, John's parents decided to emigrate with the youngest son Alfred to Canada. It is thought that John (then 14) and his two siblings, Charles and Fanny, were looked after by various relatives including an uncle in Walham Green, and a great uncle who owned a farm near Kimpton in Hertfordshire.

He showed artistic ability at a young age and received some training at art school as well as instruction from a local artist called Hackman. At the age of 10 he completed his first watercolour, The Thames from Wandsworth, which was subsequently exhibited by the Royal Watercolour Society in 1919. A number of other watercolours and sketches were also completed in his teens.

At the age of 16, he was apprenticed to produce illustrations for the notable London-based wood engraver Josiah Whymper. There North became friends with Frederick Walker, Arthur Boyd Houghton and George John Pinwell, who would later become associated with the Idyllic school. He worked – using a brush and pencil – on black and white illustrations for various publications, gaining a reputation for the quality of his landscapes.

In 1868 he moved to Somerset, renting a room at Halsway Manor near Crowcombe – his friend and fellow artist Frederick Walker also lived there. North's vivid watercolour of Halsway Manor, from 1865, is in the British Museum, London. In 1866 North's parents returned from Canada and he became the main provider for the whole family. North moved to the village of Woolston in 1869.

The period 1860–67 brought both artistic success as an illustrator and financial security. North was also developing his skill as a watercolourist, so much so that in 1867 he decided to pursue his painting full-time and abandon his illustration work. He made his debut at the Royal Academy in 1869 with four watercolours, including The Wood Gatherers (1869; Cleveland Museum of Art). In the subsequent years up to 1887, he divided his time painting between Somerset, a studio in London, and a house in Algeria. North exhibited at the Grosvenor Gallery and the New Gallery and was a member of Arts Club. He was eventually accepted as a member of the Royal Watercolour Society (RWS) and an associate of the Royal Academy (ARA).

In 1884 North married the 21-year-old Selina Weetch at Bicknoller Church in Somerset, setting up home in Beggearn Huish House in Nettlecombe. They went on to have six children, including Roland Arthur Charles North. Selina died in 1898.

North became friends with the essayist Richard Jefferies in 1883 until the latter's death in 1887. Subsequently, North was involved in setting up a fund for Jefferies' widow and family, and invited them to stay at his home in Somerset, even arranging for the education of Jefferies' son Harold.

In 1895, North started the O.W. Paper & Arts Co. featuring fine papers for art printing and watercolor.

In personality and politics North was a liberal, publicly championing the cause of social justice for the agricultural labouring class. He opposed the enclosure of common lands, campaigned for decent rural sanitation and for social housing.

North died at Stamborough, Somerset in 1924, and is buried in the New Cemetery at Nettlecombe.

== Art ==
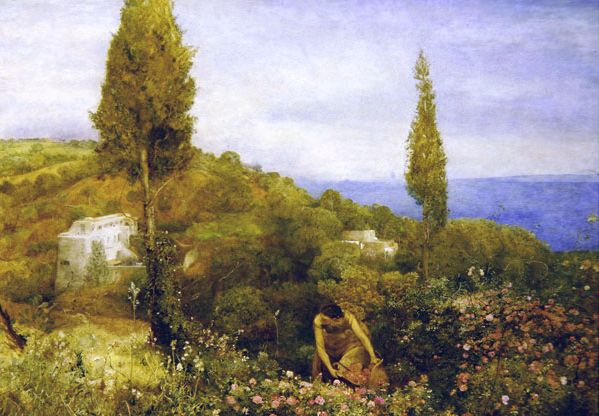
The house of roses, Tripoli

The term "idyllist" is more properly applied to North's earlier black and white landscapes, which were driven by the necessity to illustrate a particular literary narrative. His later watercolour work was certainly not idyllist in the nostalgic, "chocolate-box art" sense of the word, but attempted to evoke a sense of spiritual communion with nature. In this North owed a lot to his friend Richard Jefferies, and biographer Herbert Alexander noted that North had to be in the right state of mind before he would start a painting.

In 1895, North helped to develop a new, kind of linen-based art paper that was extraordinarily durable and ideally suited to the demands of the watercolourist. He experimented with this paper for the rest of his life and was able to develop a very detailed painting style using ordinary watercolor paint and no gouache. He built up his forms by applying the paints in very small dots and touches of pure colour – a technique predating pointillism by a decade.
