= Halsway Manor =

Former manorial estate in Stogumber, Somerset, England

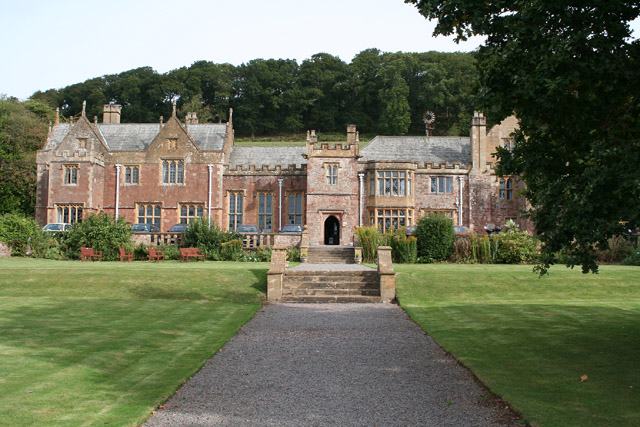

- Location within Somerset

General information
- Location: Halsway, England
- Coordinates: 51.1326°N 3.2454°W
- Completed: 15th century

Website
- http://www.halswaymanor.org.uk/

Halsway Manor (also known as Halsway Court) is a manor house in Halsway, Somerset. It is owned by the Halsway Manor Society who operate the manor as a national centre for the folk arts. It is the only residential folk centre in the UK. It is situated off the A358 road between Taunton and Williton on the edge of the Quantock Hills.

== Buildings ==
Halsway manor was held in 1086 by Roger de Courcelles with Alric, the owner in 1066, as his tenant. The manor passed through many owners down to 1965 and these are listed in the Victoria County History for Somerset, Volume 5.

The manor house, which is mentioned in the Domesday Book, is claimed to have been built by Cardinal Beaufort as a hunting lodge. The eastern end of the building dates from the fifteenth century; the western end is a nineteenth-century addition. The interior was substantially altered in the 1920s and 1930s, with interior panelling and mantelpieces brought in from various other houses.

The house was a family home until the mid-1960s, when it became the folk music centre. It has been designated by English Heritage as a grade II* listed building. There is a ballroom, library and lounge bar with an impressive entrance hall. The latter has oak panelling and staircase, with an open fireplace and barrel ceiling. The mews is now used for accommodation.

In 1859, John Henry Parker wrote in his Account of Domestic Architecture:

The front is nearly perfect, with a parapet battlemented and enriched with quatre-foil panels, two projections having also battlements and pinnacles, a bay-window, and a good small chimney, some curious gargoyles, and a good bell-cot. The front is long and low, and has three doorways; the hall forms only a small part of the house.

Between 1860 and 1868, the Victorian painter John William North stayed for long periods at Halsway, at times with Frederick Walker and George John Pinwell.

== Folk Centre ==
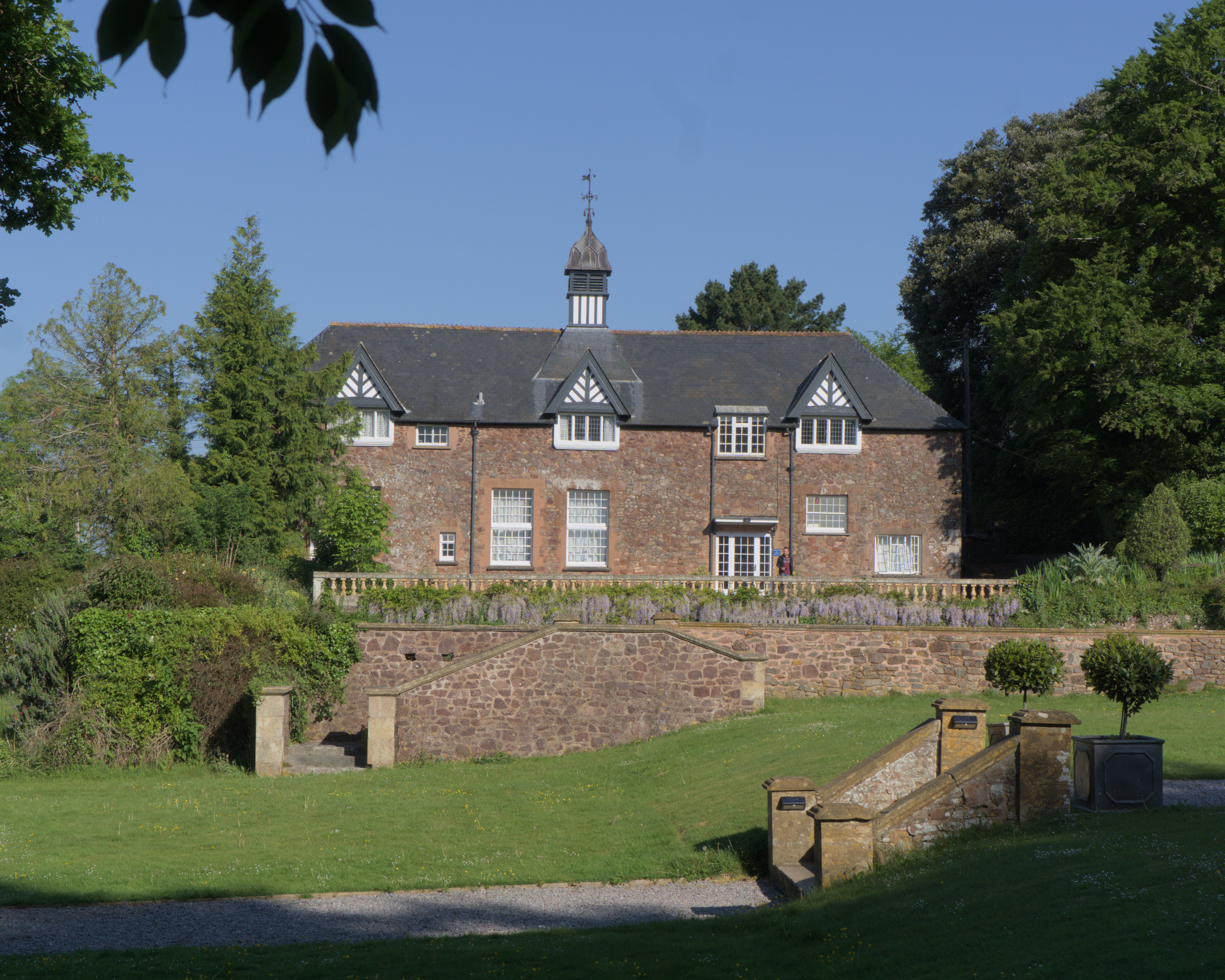
Mews building at Halsway Manor

Halsway Manor Society Ltd was registered as a charity on 8 March 1966 to promote participation in the folk arts — traditional folk music, dance, song, storytelling, folklore and related arts and crafts — through a year-round programme of residential courses, classes, events and activities for people of all ages and abilities. Participants come from all over the country and abroad. Local people are encouraged to get involved through regular dance and music clubs, concerts, an annual festival, fete and craft fairs.
