= William Small (artist) =

Scottish illustrator and artist

- Born: 27 May 1843; Edinburgh, Scotland
- Died: 30 December 1929 (aged 86); Worcester, England

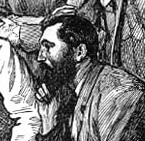
Portrait of Small by T.B. Wirgman

William Small (27 May 1843 – 1929) was a Scottish illustrator and artist. His works are held by art galleries in Leicester, Liverpool, London and Manchester and his illustrations in noted periodicals including: Once a week, Good Words, The Graphic and Harpers. The Metropolitan Museum of Art describes him as being considered the most successful illustrator of his time. His style is typically Victorian, and sometimes connected with the Idyllic school.
