= Joseph Swain (engraver) =

English wood-engraver (1820-1909)

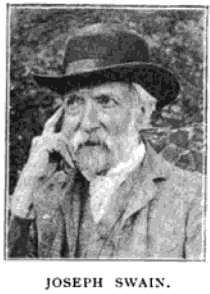

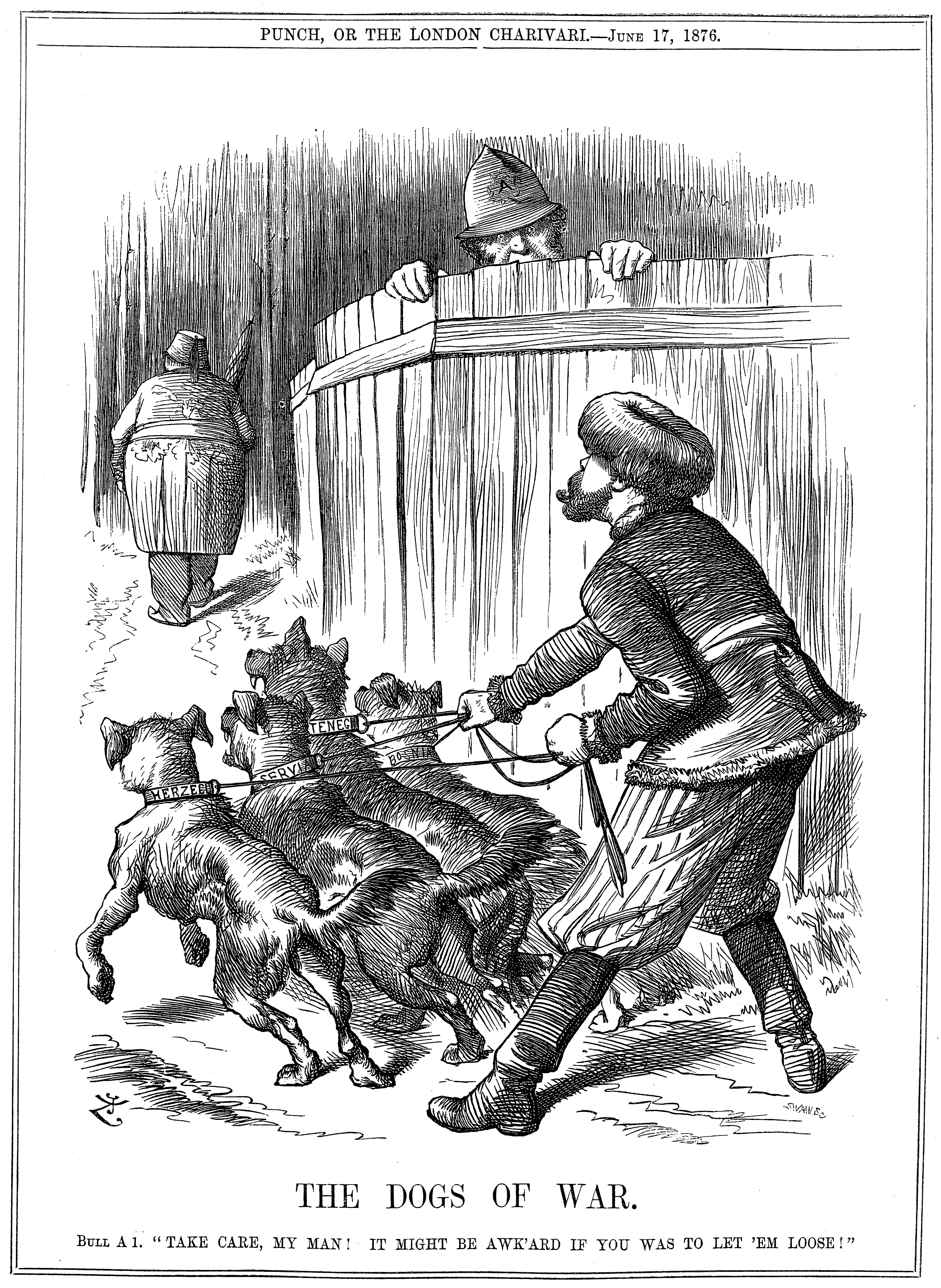
The Dogs of War, political cartoon by John Tenniel engraved by Joseph Swain, 17 June 1876, for Punch magazine, just at the outbreak of the Serbo-Turkish War

Joseph Swain (29 February 1820 in Oxford – 25 February 1909 in London) was an English wood-engraver. He is best known from his wood-engravings in Punch magazine of cartoons by Sir John Tenniel.

== Life ==
Born in Oxford in 1820, he was second son of Ebenezer Swain by his wife Harriet James; Joseph Swain, pastor of East Street Baptist church, Walworth, was his grandfather. He was educated at private schools, first in Oxford, and then in London, where the family moved in 1829.

In 1834 Swain was apprenticed by his father, a printer with the firm of Wertheimer & Co., to the wood-engraver Nathaniel Whittock, and was transferred in 1837 to Thomas Williams, brother of Samuel Williams. In 1843 he was appointed manager of the engraving department of Punch, but in the following year set up in business for himself, retaining the whole of the engraving work for Punch from 1844 until 1900.

He taught William Harcourt Hooper.

Swain died at Ealing in west London in 1909.

John Bull (Great Britain) is dwarfed by a gigantic inflated American "Alabama Claim" cartoon by Joseph Swain in Punch--or the London Charivari 22 Jan 1872.

== Works ==
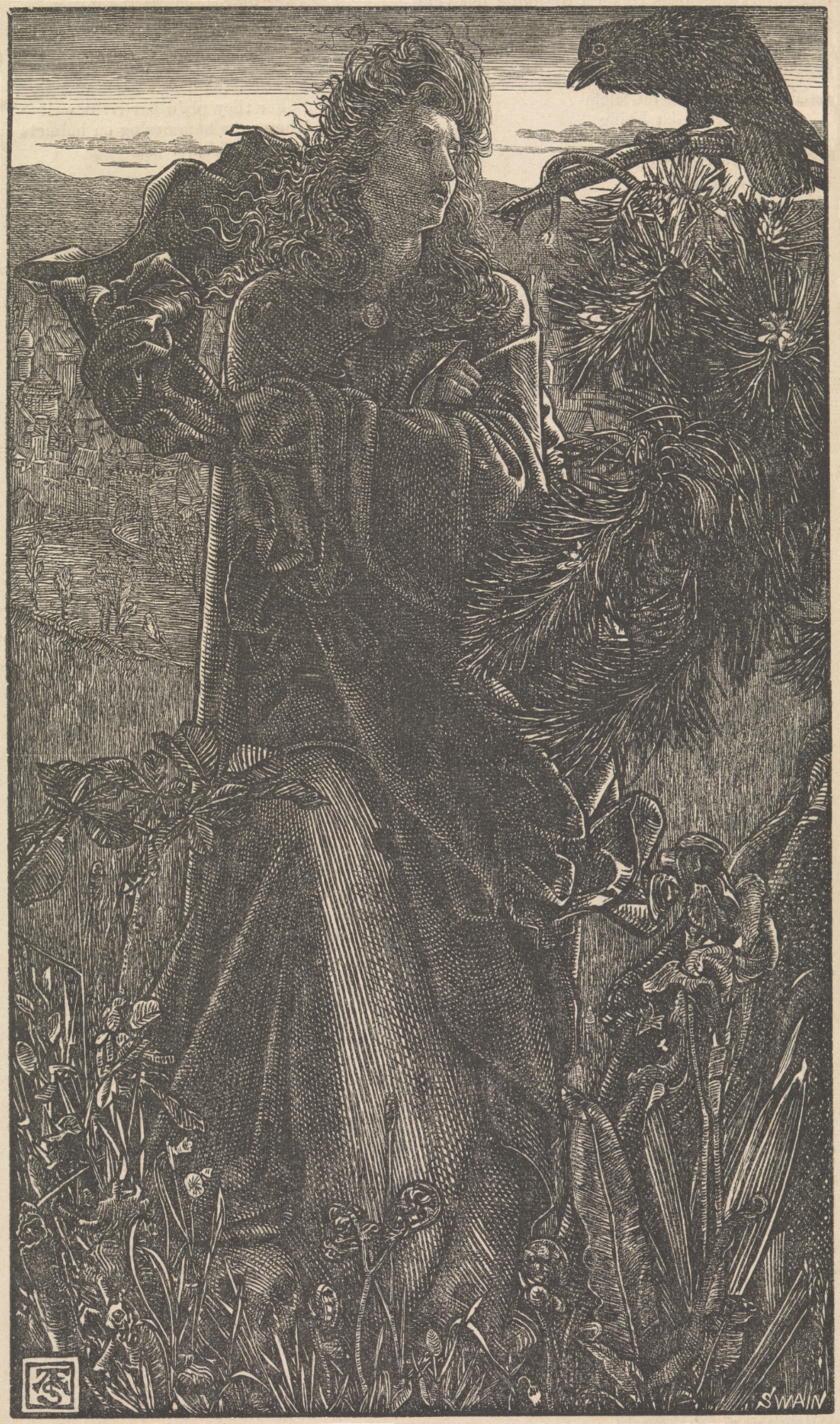
Valkyrie and Raven, 1862 wood-engraving by Joseph Swain after Frederick Sandys, illustration to the Hrafnsmál

Swain was one of the most prolific wood-engravers of the nineteenth century. His own work is not always signed, and the signature "Swain sc" must be taken to include the engraving of assistants working for his firm. In the later 19th century his wood-engravings were generally printed from electrotypes; but those done for Punch were printed from the original wood-blocks.

Nearly all the illustrations in the Cornhill Magazine were engraved by Swain, and he also worked largely for other periodicals such as Once a Week, Good Words, The Argosy, and for the publications of the Religious Tract Society and the Baptist Missionary Society. He engraving extensively after Fred Walker, John Everett Millais, Frederick Sandys, Richard Doyle, Richard Ansdell, Fred Barnard, and other major illustrators, from 1860 onwards.

A series of articles on Fred Walker, Charles Henry Bennett, George John Pinwell, and Fritz Eltze, which Swain wrote for Good Words (1888–89), were incorporated in Toilers in Art, edited by Henry C. Ewart (1891).

== Family ==
In 1843 Swain married Martha Cooper. They had three daughters and a son, Joseph Blomeley Swain, who carried on the printing and engraving establishment.

== Notes ==
Attribution This article incorporates text from a publication now in the public domain: Lee, Sidney, ed. (1912). "Swain, Joseph". Dictionary of National Biography (2nd supplement). Vol. 3. London: Smith, Elder & Co.
