= George John Pinwell =

British watercolourist and illustrator (1842-1875)

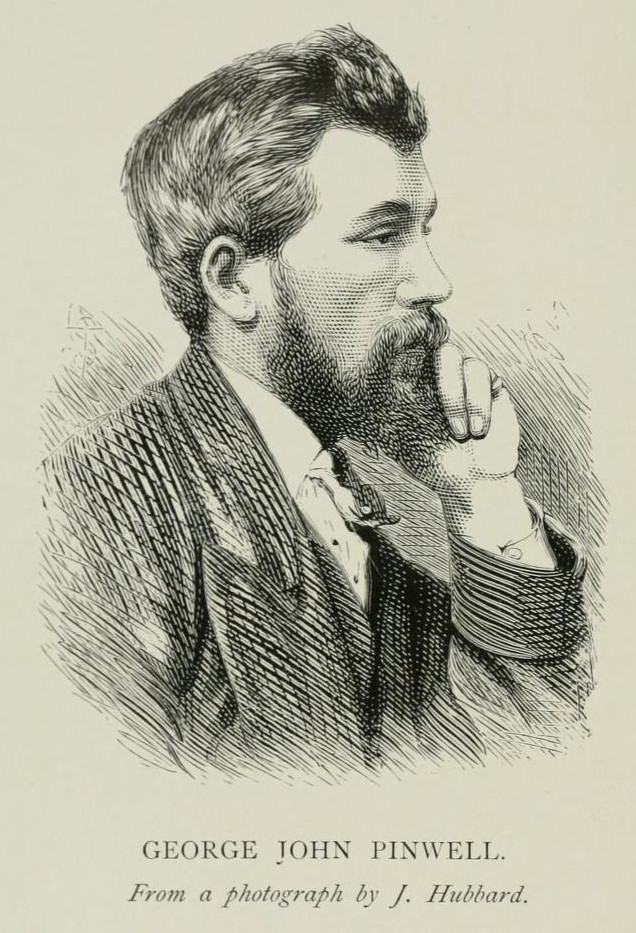
- George J. Pinwell from a photograph by John Hubbard
- Born: 26 December 1842; London, England
- Died: 8 September 1875 (aged 32); London
- Occupations: Artist and illustrator
- Years active: 1862–1875
- Notable work: Dalziels' Illustrated Goldsmith (Note: This was published both as a part book and as a single volume set in a small typeface containing: The Vicar of Wakefield, The Traveller, Retaliation, The Deserted Village, Miscellaneous Poems, The Haunch of Venison, The Good-Natured Man, The Captivity: An Oratorio, She Stoops to Conquer, and a sketch of the live of Goldsmith by H. W. Dulcken.)

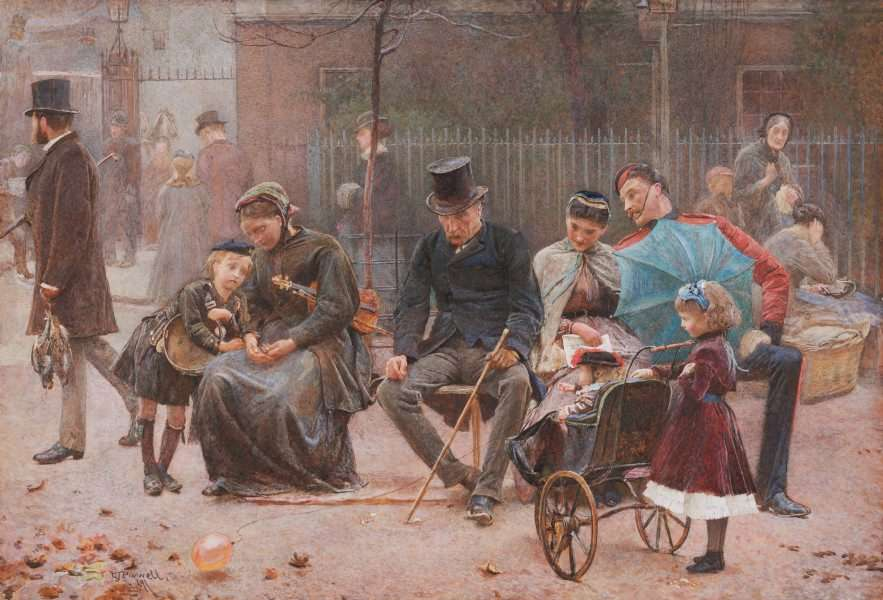
A Seat in St James's Park, 1869, watercolur and bodycolour, NSW Art Gallery, 41.9 x 60.2 cm

George John Pinwell RWS (London 26 December 1842 – 8 September 1875 London), was a British illustrator and watercolourist, a key member of the Idyllist school. He belonged to the small group of watercolour painters which included Frederick Walker and Arthur Boyd Houghton, whose style came from drawing on wood for book-illustration. His career was cut short by an early death at only 32.

Pinwell contributed watercolours to the Dudley Gallery from 1865 onwards, and in 1869 was elected associate of the Royal Watercolour Society and then full member in 1871; he exhibited fifty-nine works with them.

He came from a poor background, but received his art education the St. Martin's Lane Academy and from 1862 the Heatherley School of Fine Art. His earliest drawings appeared in Littiput Levée. He did a little work for the periodical Fun and executed several designs for the silversmiths Elkington's. He worked for Josiah Wood Whymper and through him met J W North and Fred Walker. In 1863 his first drawing appeared in Once a Week and from that time his work was in constant demand. There were many of his compositions in Good Words, The Sunday Magazine, The Quiver and London Society, and he subsequently illustrated for the Dalziel Brothers' editions of Oliver Goldsmith, of Jean Ingelow's poems, Robert Buchanan's Ballads of the Affections, and the Arabian Nights. Best-known were two scenes from the Pied Piper of Hamelin, the Troth of Gilbert Becket, the Saracen Maiden the legendary mother of Thomas Becket, Out of Tune (or The Old Cross), A Seat in St James's Park (1869; Art Gallery of New South Wales, Sydney) and The Elixir of Life.

In 1874 Pinwell fell seriously ill and went to Africa for the winter. He painted three major watercolours at Tangier, which were among his last works exhibited at the Royal Watercolour Society in 1875, but his strength gradually broke down and he returned to die in his wife's arms in London. He is buried at Highgate Cemetery. A posthumous exhibition of his works was held in 21 February – 11 March 1876 at 168 New Bond Street.

== Biography ==
Pinwell was born on 26 December 1842 at 12 Great Mays Buildings, London. He was baptised on 27 July 1845, at St Mark's Church, Surbiton, south-west London, along with his younger brother Henry (born c. 1845). His parents were John Pinwell, (Note: While the Oxford Dictionary of National Biography gives his father's name as John, his marriage registration gives his name as George John, and his trade as a builder. However the census and other records give his father's name as John and his occupation as carpenter.) a carpenter or builder, and his wife, Mary Ann Baker. Pinwell's father was thought to have been involved in building the original Surbiton railway station in south-west London. His mother was "a rough, illiterate woman", and "a rough and determined person."

Pinwell's father died in 1854, leaving the family in very straitened circumstances. He apparently worked as a butterman's boy in the City Road, London whose work, among other things was to stand outside the shop on Saturday nights shouting "Buy| Buy| Buy!" (Note: The origin of the butterman's boy story is apparently art critic Harry Quilter's preface to a Catalogue of the Birmingham Society of Artists, in March 1895. Reid considers that this story may or may not be true, but Trimpe gives it as fact in her account of Pinwell in the Oxford Dictionary of National Biography.)

He then worked making designs for a firm of embroiderers. In the 1861 census he recorded his occupation as "designer of Embroidery". His two younger brothers Henry (born c. 1845) and Alfred (Note: Alfred's name was given as called Frederick in the 1851 census) (born c. 1847), both had their occupation listed as house carpenter.

His work on embroidery design led to him meeting his future wife Isabella Marcy Stevens (c. 1843 – first quarter of 1923) who needed a design for a difficult piece of work. The acquaintanceship grew into affection, and eventually to marriage. The couple were married at St. Marylebone in London on 24 April 1865. The 1911 census shows that the marriage was without issue.

While working at the embroiderers Pinwell attended night school at St. Martin's Lane Academy. After his mother's remarriage in 1861 removed the need for him to work, he became a full time pupil at the Academy, and in 1862 he moved on to Heatherley's Academy. In the following year he was drawing on wood blocks for the Dalziel Brothers.

The 1871 census shows his profession as an artist in watercolours, residing at 52 Adeliaid Road in Hampstead. In 1874 Pinwell fell seriously ill and went to North Africa for the winter and spent eight months there. He returned to London in the spring of 1875. He died of consumption on 8 September 1875 at 86 Adelaide Road, Haverstock, South Hampstead, London. His estate was valued at less than £800 (Note: His long illness and the expense of travelling to Africa has reduced his resources and his savings.) and his wife was the executrix.

The Great Lady, 1873, watercolour

He was buried on 11 September 1875 on the western side of Highgate Cemetery. His two brothers, and two brothers-in-law, Alfred and Thomas Stevens, attended the funeral. His grave (plot no.20882) has no headstone or visible memorial.

His professional friends came together after his death to raise a fund for the benefit of the widow. Many of his studies and sketches were made public after his death. A posthumous exhibition of his works was held in February to March at M. Deschamp's Gallery at 168 New Bond Street. After the exhibition, any works that were not private property were to be sold at Christie's for the benefit of the widow.

George C. Williamson wrote a biography of Pinwell in 1900. However, Reid states that this was undertaken largely for the satisfaction of Pinwell's widow, and that "its main purpose seems to be to persuade us that Pinwell could hold his own in the most refined society" and to counter "contemporary allegations concerning his sobriety and his grammar."

== Work ==
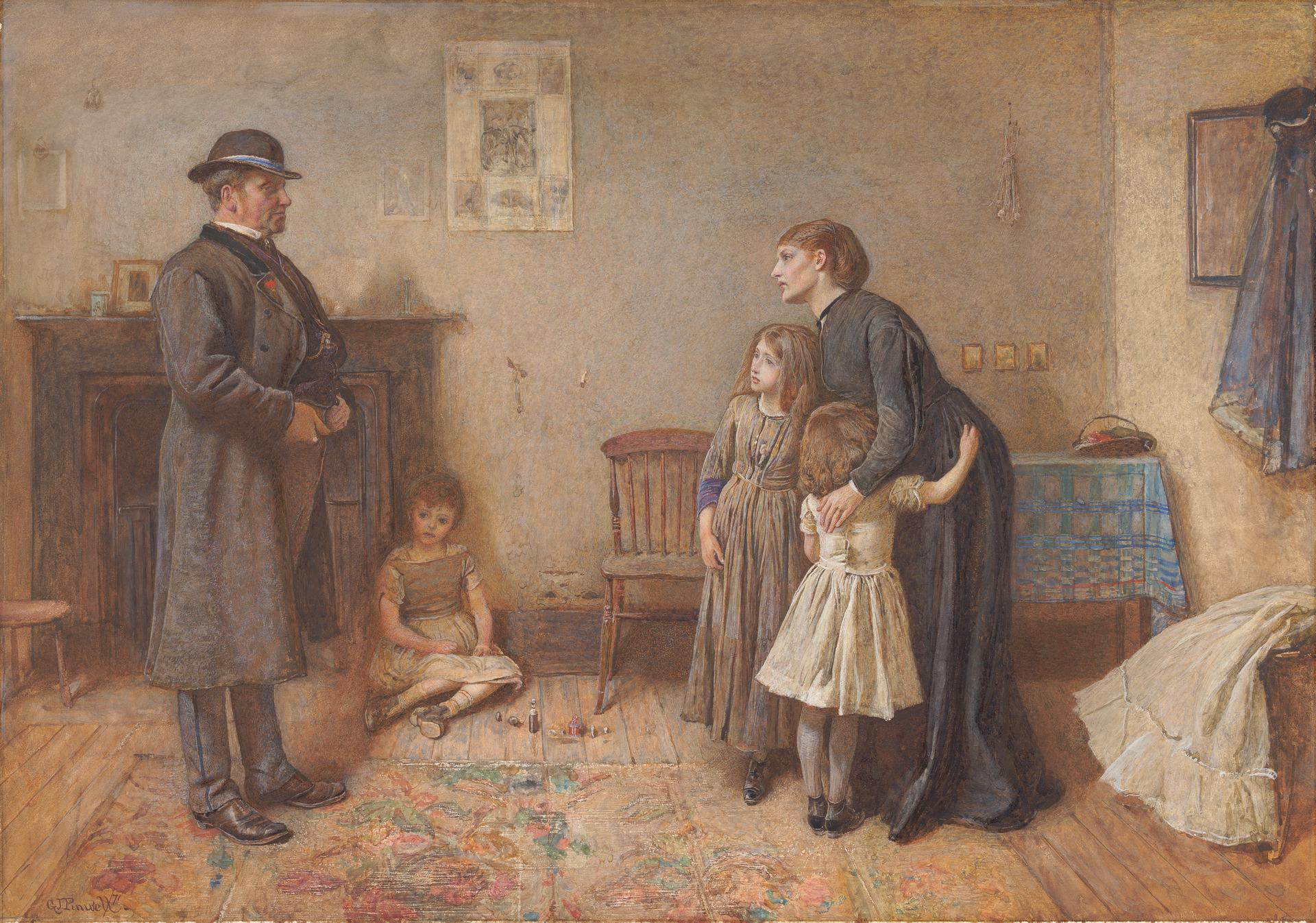
Landlord and Tenant, watercolour, 1871, Yale Center for British Art

Williamson states that Pinwell's his first drawing appeared in Lilliput Levee in 1862, a book of rhymes for children by Matthew Browne(a pseudonym used by William Brighty Rands) (Note: However, the British Library catalogue dates Lilliput Levee with illustrations by John Everett Millais (1829–1896) and Pinwell to 1864. Reid also gives 1862 as the date of publication.)

He executed several designs for the silversmiths Elkington's. He worked for Josiah Wood Whymper, not as a regular apprentice, but in an informal arrangement. At Whymper's Pinwell met J W North an apprentice of Whymper.

Pinwell belonged to the small group of watercolour painters which included Frederick Walker and Arthur Boyd Houghton, whose style came from drawing on wood for book-illustration. Pinwell, Walker, and Houghton, three young men "who did so much for wood engraving in the sixties" all died in 1875 within seven months of each other. Reid notes that there is a legend that Pinwell and Walker were friends, but in reality, this was not so. Walker only once visited Pinwell's house, in 1873, and he had already left Whymper when Pinwell started there. Roget notes the many similarities between the lives of Pinwell and Walker: both died early in their careers, Pinwell was two and a half years younger than Walker, and survived him by only three months, both were partially educated at Heatherley's Academy, both began their profession as draughtsmen on wood, and in some cases worked on the same books, both died from consumption (Note: Roget only refers to the cause of death as "a fatal malady" but both Walker and Pinwell died of consumption.) after attempting to stem it with a winter in Africa, they shared a common style, and shared common subjects, and had posthumous exhibitions at M. Deschamp's gallery in London after their deaths.

Together with Walker, another pupil of Whymper, and North, Pinwell was a member of a group known as the Idyllic School or the Idealists of which Walker is seen as the leader. (Note: Reid seems to have been the first to use the term. Goldman divides the Victorian illustrators into three groups: The Pre-Raphaelites, the Idyllic School, and other styles, including the High Victorians.) The name seems to come from the book Idyllic Pictures, an anthology of illustrations from The Quiver, printed from the original wood blocks, each accompanied by a poem, many of which were published for the first time. A Round of Days (George Routledge and Sons, London, 1866) also consisted of poems with individual illustrations, is "sometimes considered archetypally Idyllic in spirit", and as it contains work by Walker and North as well as Pinwell and Houghton, is probably more representative of the school. Gleeson White described it as "one of the finest of the illustrated gift books".

The following five illustrations were Pinwell's contribution to A Round of Days. The Dalziel Brothers described the title as having been "chosen to designate a collection of Poems and Pictures representing every-day scenes, occurrences, and incidents in various phases of assistance." Each poem has at least one accompanying illustration. In some cases the artist had illustrated the poem, in others the poet has tried to portray in words the ideas in an illustration.

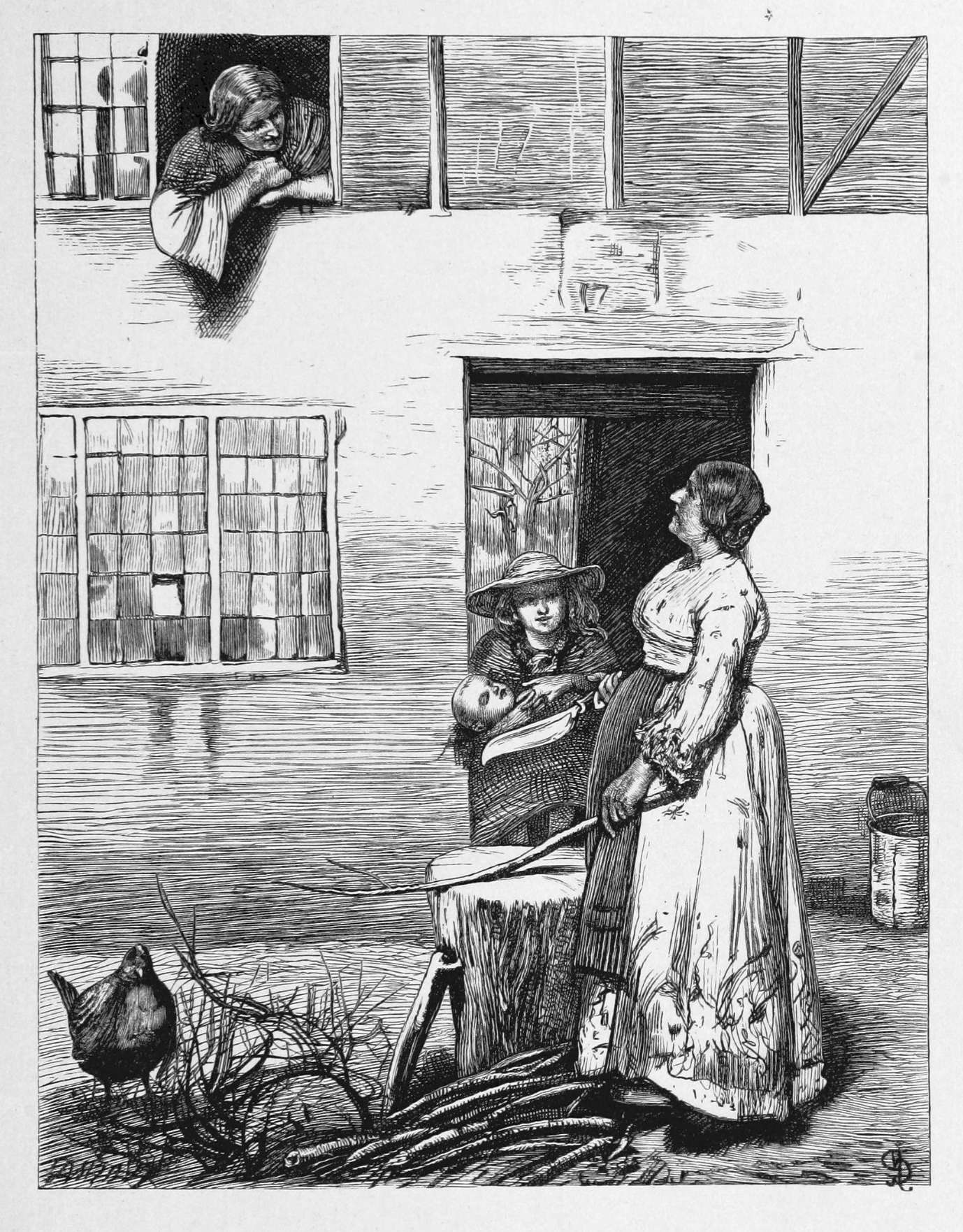
On the Threshold

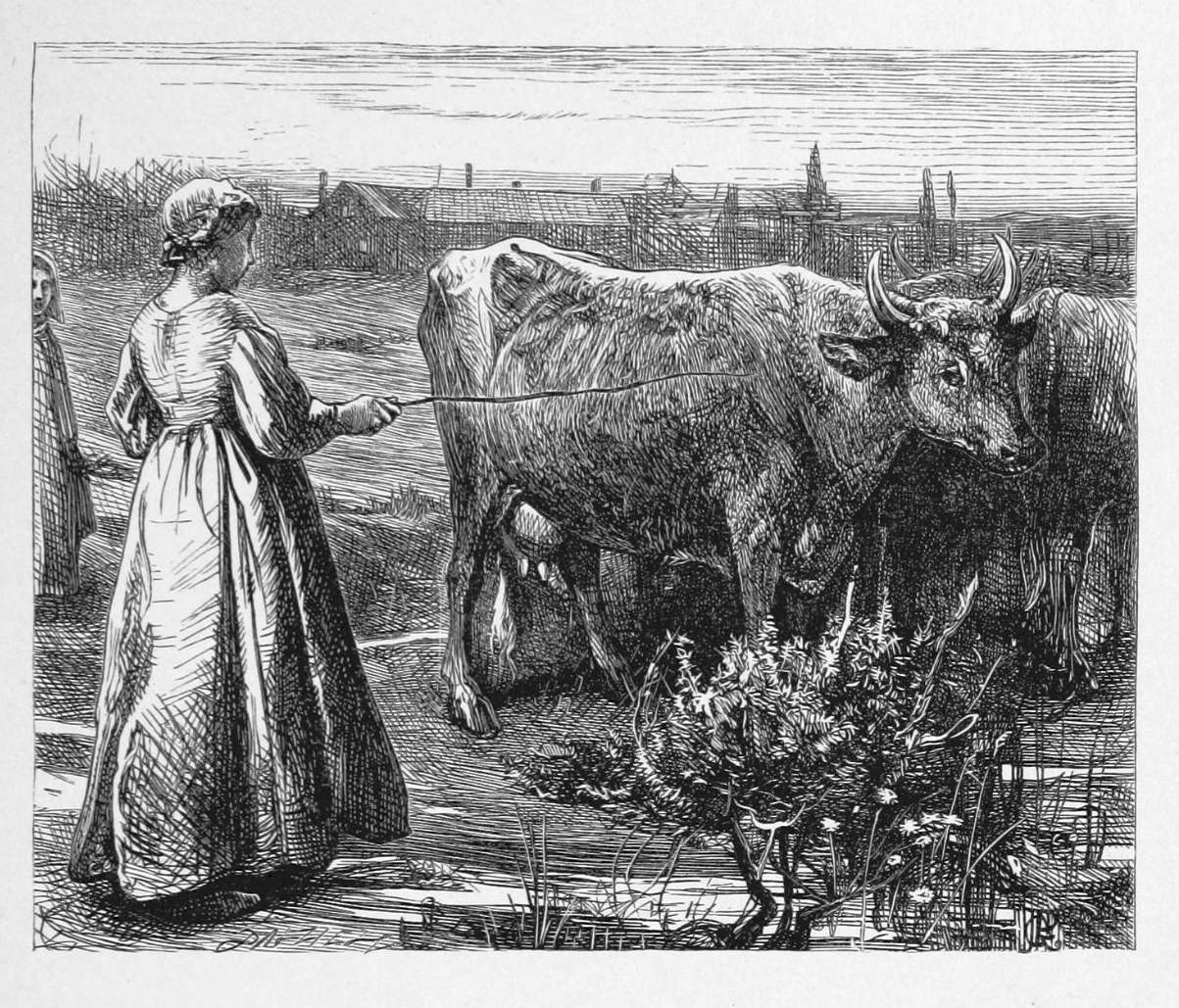
Driving in the cows

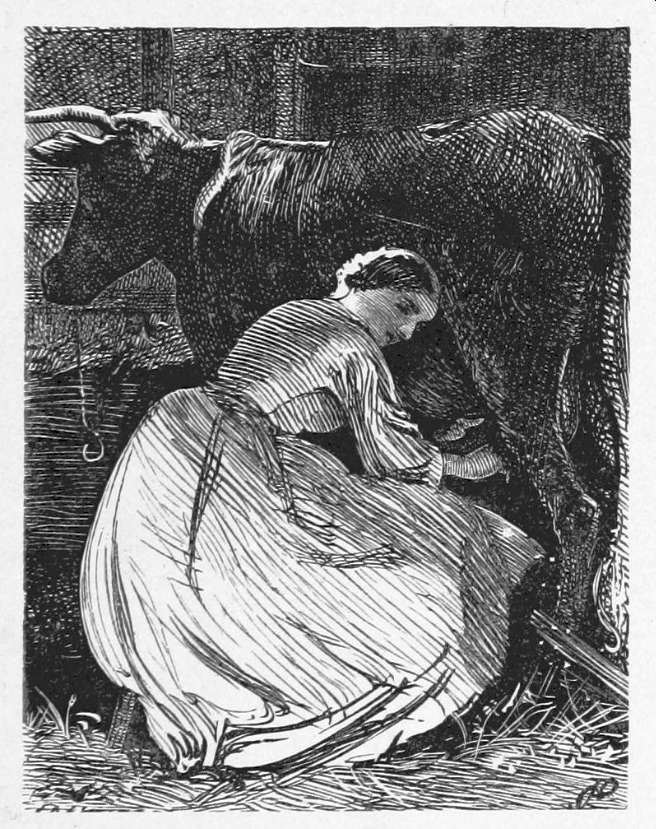
Milking a cow

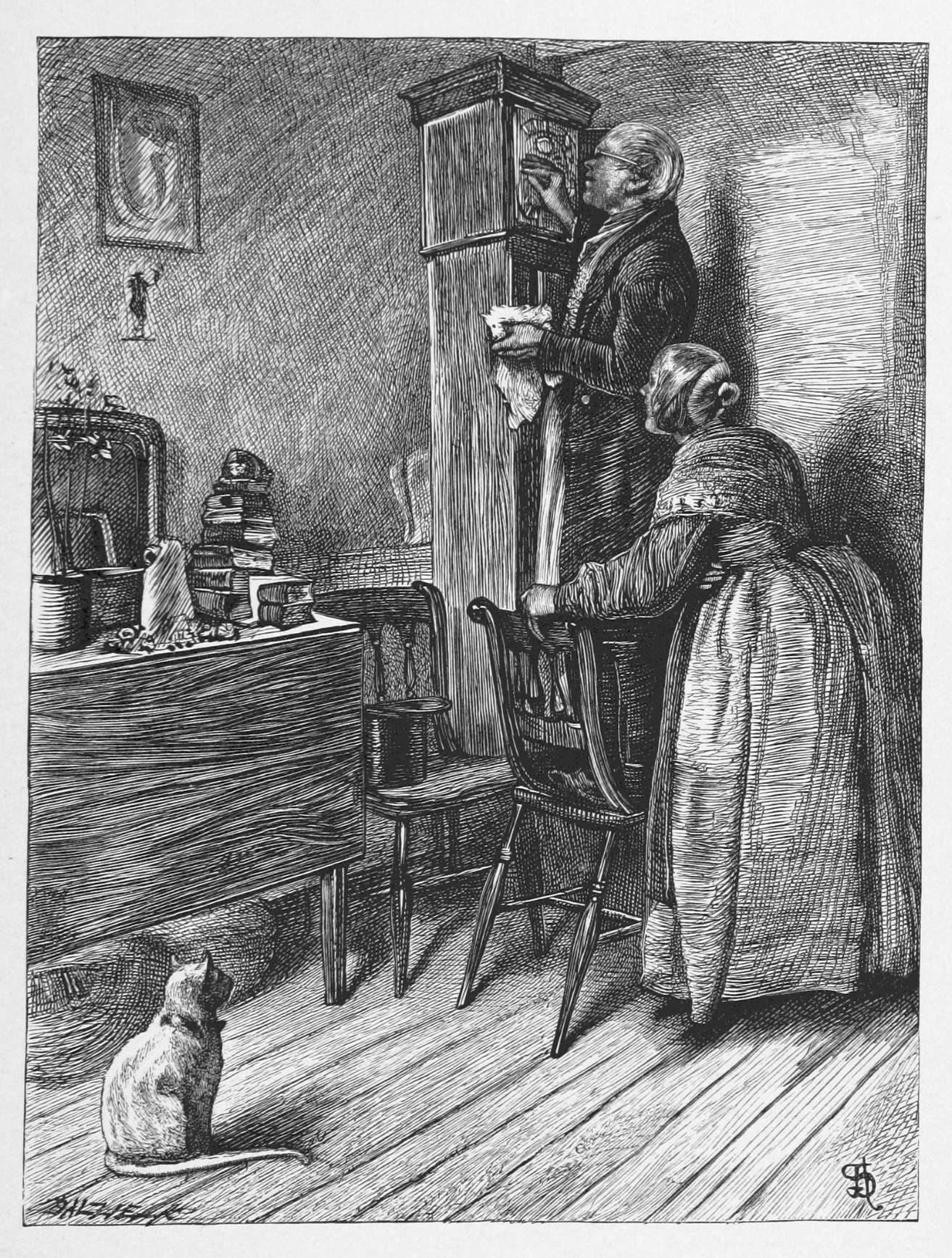
Adjusting the clock

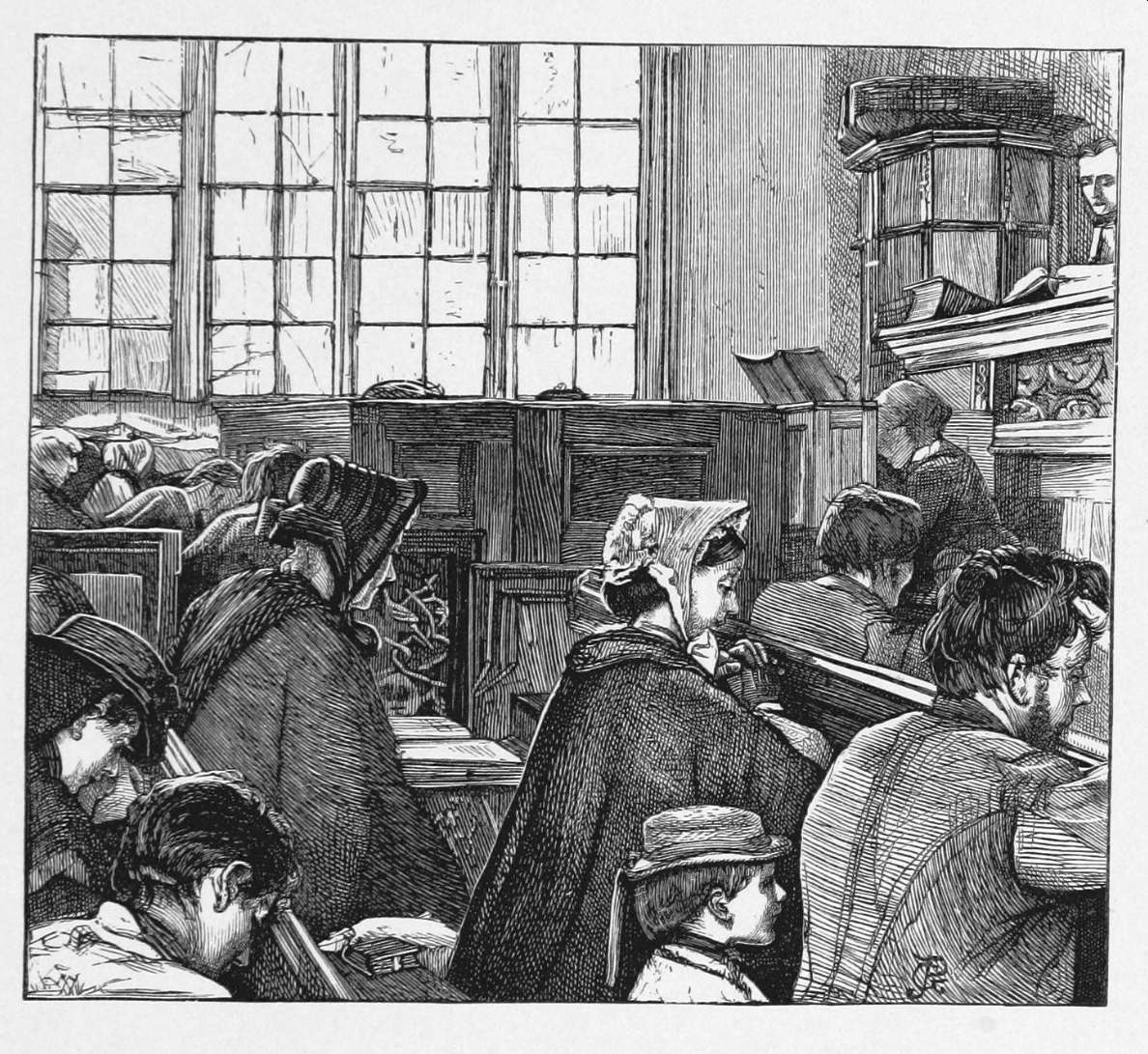
In church

Gilbert à Becket's Troth - The Saracen Maiden Entering London at Sundown, 1872, watercolour. Based on an illustration of his.

Pinwell's best watercolours were probably the three paintings he submitted for membership of the Royal Watercolour Society. These were A Seat in the Park and two scenes from the Pied Piper of Hamelin, The Pied Piper of Hamlin (rats) and The Pied Piper of Hamlin (children). Other well regarded pictures were The Elixir of Love, The Troth of Gilbert Becket, the Saracen Maiden the legendary mother of Thomas Becket (1872), Out of Town, and Landlord and Tenant.

He painted three major watercolours at Tangier, which were among his last works exhibited at the Royal Watercolour Society in 1875. However, The Graphic considered that, although full of interest, the Tangier pictures showed signs "of failing power". Pinwell contributed watercolours to the Dudley Gallery from 1865 onwards, and in 1869 was elected associate of the Royal Watercolour Society and then full member in 1871. In all, he exhibited fifty-nine works at the Royal Watercolour Society.

Cundall states that Pinwell made many small watercolours "of subjects which he had already produced in black-and-white". His first exhibited watercolour, An Incident in the Life of Oliver Goldsmith, shown in the Dudley Gallery in 1865, was based on the themes and imagery he had used for Dalziel's Illustrated Goldsmith. In the following example the black-and-white engraving was prepared from the watercolour. Note that the engraving Joseph Swain is reversed from the watercolour, a normal feature of engravings as the final print is a mirror image of the engraving. The engraving was cropped before printing it in Once a Week on 26 June 1869. It also suffers from being marked with a partial impression of the text from the following page. This was the only illustration by Pinwell appearing in that volume of the magazine. The watercolour was one of the three paintings submitted by Pinwell for membership of the Water Colour Society. (Note: The other two were The Pied Piper of Hamlin (rats) and The Pied Piper of Hamlin (children)) The Globe stated that the watercolour was "dramatic in feeling" and showed "the most accurate perception of individual character." The Graphic described the work as "a scene of every-day observation, yet most pathetically rendered. At one end of the bench a street musician and her child are counting their scanty gains, at the other end a soldier flirts with a nurse, while between the two sits such a specimen of shabby gentility as would have assuredly won Thackeray's heart."

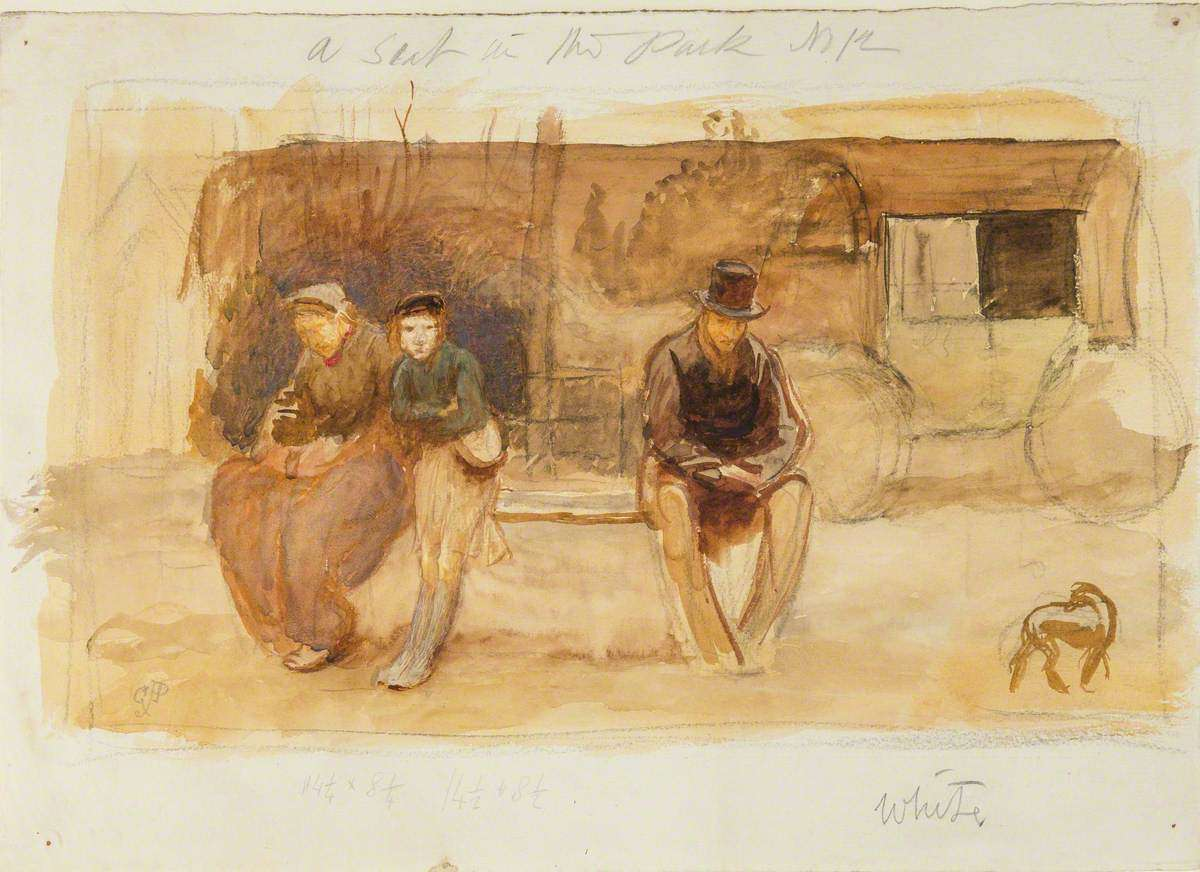
A seat in the park-An early study

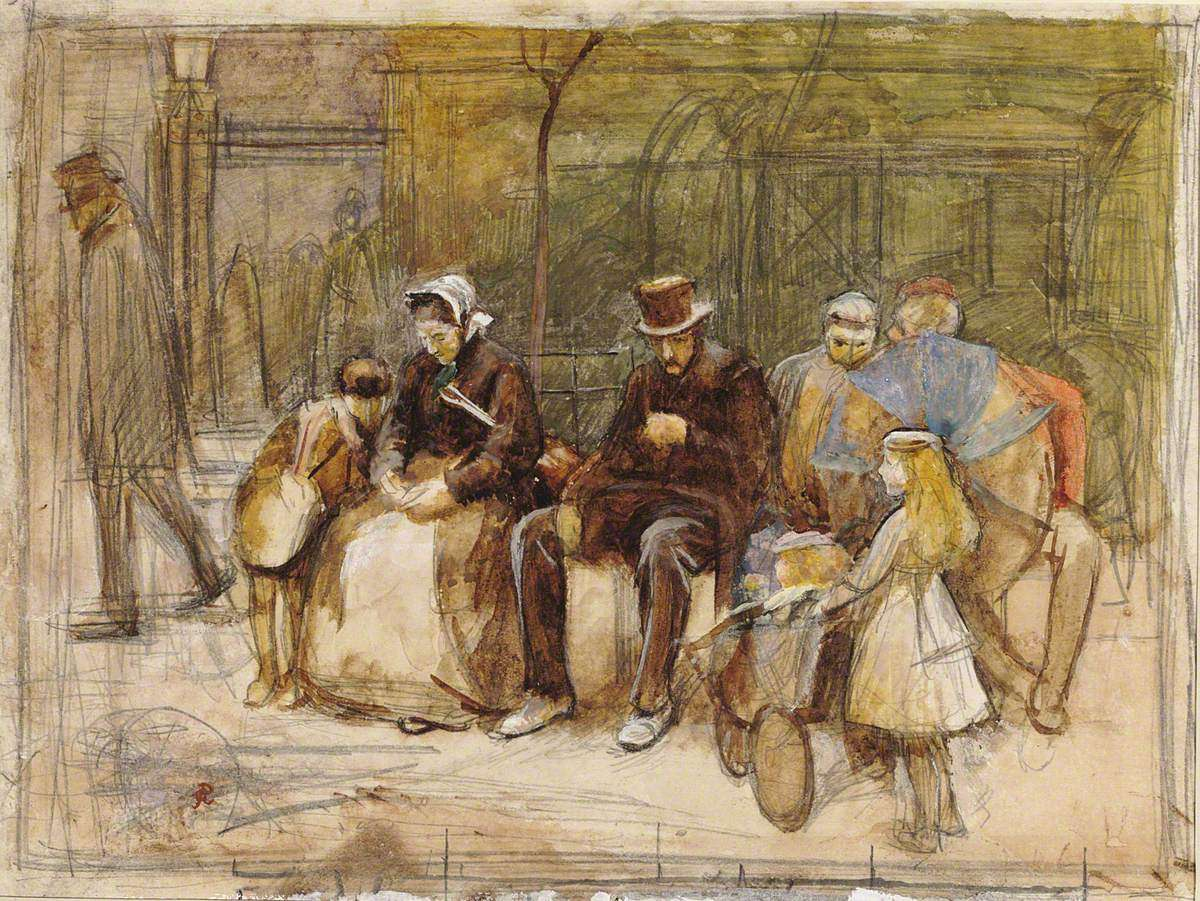
A seat in the park-More advanced study

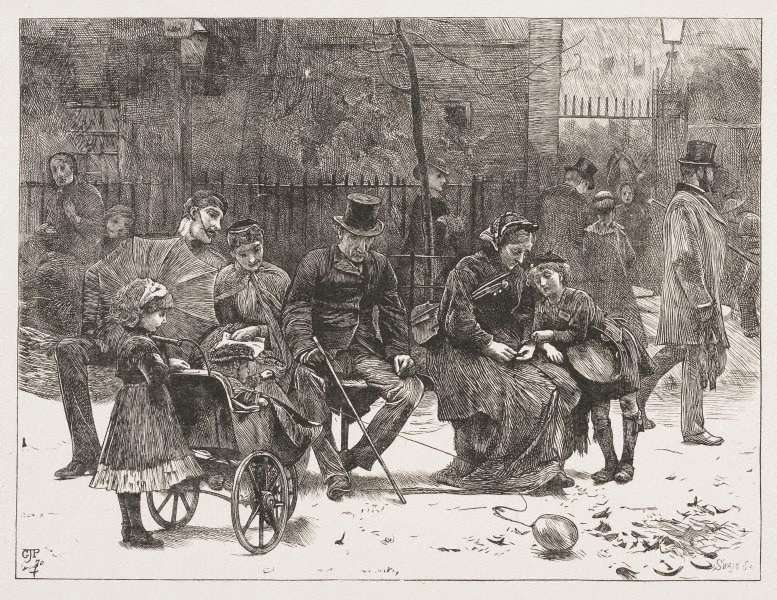
A seat in the park-A print

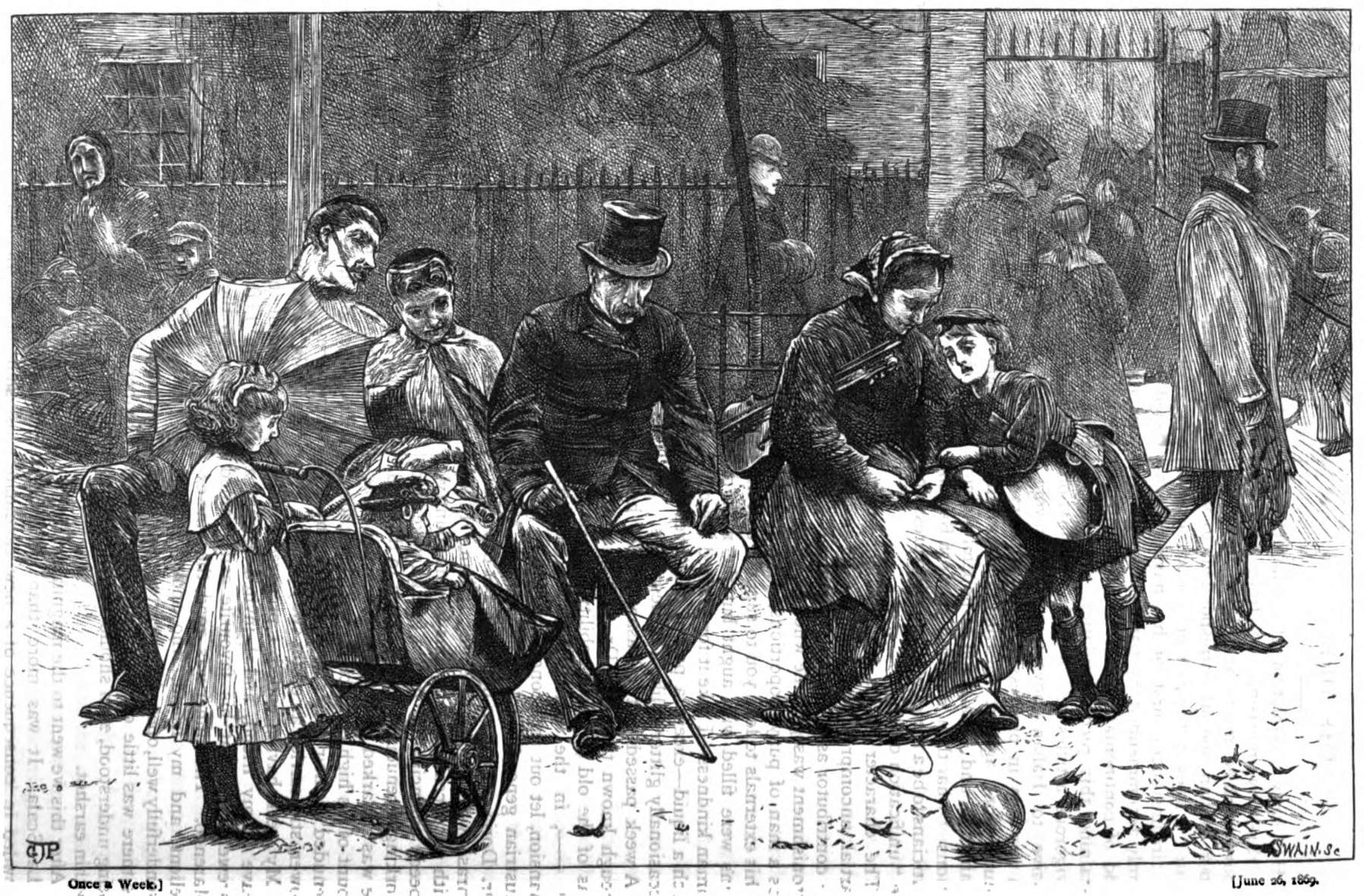
A seat in the park-The illustration as published

Pinwell most significant book illustration work was probably the Dalziel Brothers' Illustrated Goldsmith. Pinwell drew 100 illustrations for the book over a period of six months. The book was published both in weekly and monthly parts and as a single volume by Ward and Lock. The first part was launched in the same week as Cassell's illustrated Goldsmith and led to bitter recriminations between the publishers, with Cassell's accusing Ward and Lock of having copied their idea, and of thrusting an inferior product on the public. However, Liveing states that Pinwell was a better black-and-white artist than Henry Anelay (1817-1883), who illustrated Cassell's version. Both versions were issued in weekly parts at a cost of one penny, with a monthly part at fourpence or fivepence (Cassell) or sixpence (Dalziel).

Pinwell also illustrated several other books which were engraved by the Dalziels' including Jean Ingelow's poems, Robert Buchanan's Ballads of the Affections, and the Arabian Nights.

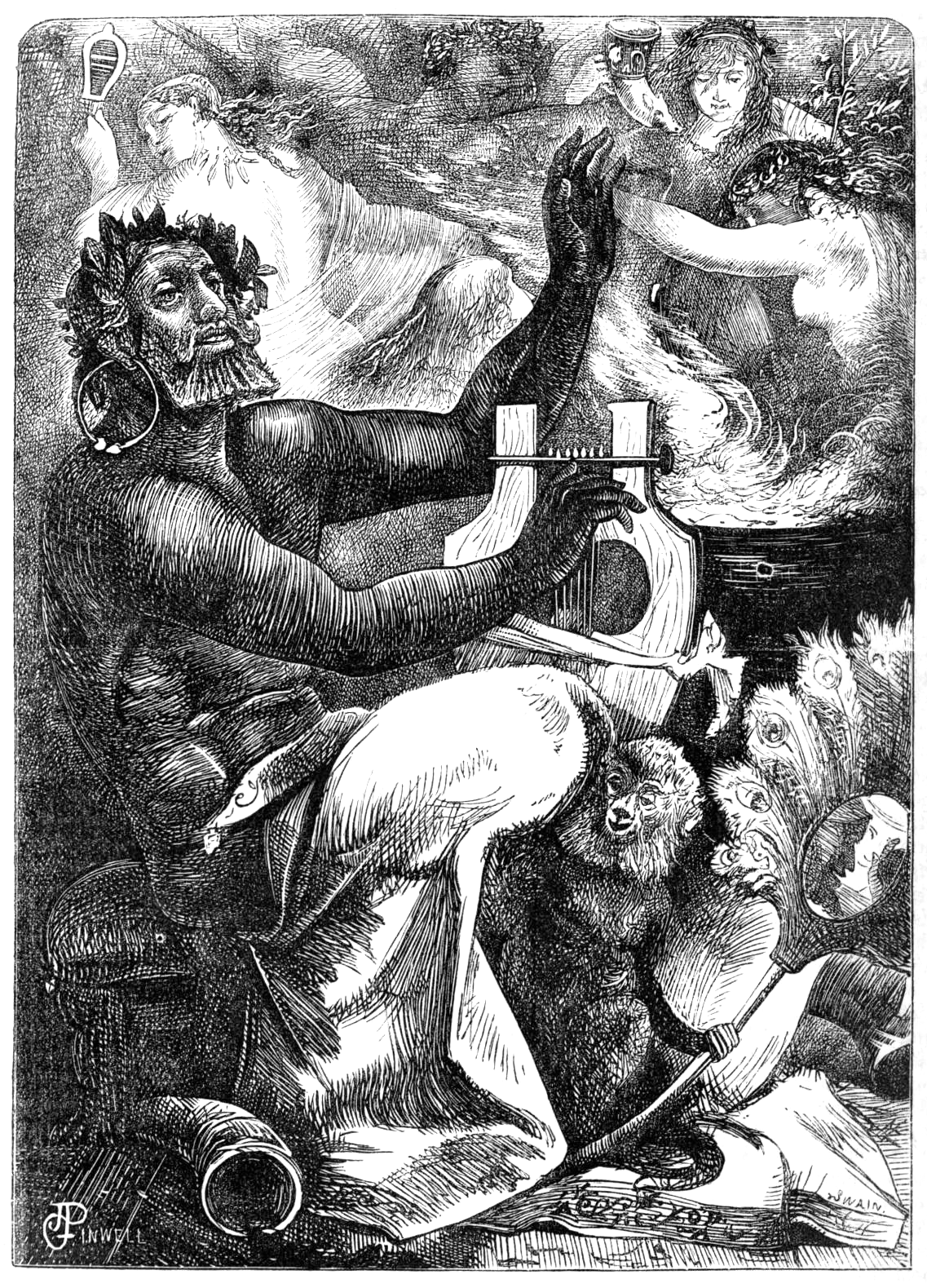
Pinwell's first magazine illustration The Saturnalia

Pinwell's first magazine illustration was for a poem by George Walter Thornbury called The Saturnalia, which appeared in volume eight of Once a Week on 31 January 1863. Gleeson White calls the illustration "a powerful but entirely untypical illustration of a classical subject by an artist who is best known for pastoral and bucolic scenes". Reid notes that the subject is "utterly remote" from the kind of subject that Pinwell would himself have chosen. From that time his work was in constant demand. Pinwell illustrated for a range of magazines including:

- The Argosy
- Cassell's Family Magazine
- Churchman's Family Magazine
- Fun
- Good Words
- Judy, or the London Serio-Comic Journal
- London Society
- Once a Week
- Punch
- Sunday at Home
- The Cornhill Magazine
- The Leisure Hour
- The Quiver
- The Sunday Magazine

== Assessment ==
Modern Book Illustrators stated that the charm of Pinwell's work was "its vivid pictorial truth to life, its dramatic feeling." The Dictionary of Victorian Painters cites Martin Hardie (Note: Watercolour Painting in Britain (Batsford, London, 1967-1968) by Martin Hardie (1875–1952), in three volumes. Volume III covers The Victorian Era and address Pinwell on pages 138-139 and on 159-180.) as saying that Pinwell could be set beside Charles Keene "as one of the greatest of British draughtsmen" Cundall notes that Pinwell "executed many small water-colour paintings with a peculiar charm" and that much of Pinwell's work "has refined feeling, but it often displays imperfections in execution." Houfe calls Pinwell "A brilliant colourist".

Reid states that the work of an artist like Pinwell is always liable to over or under estimation. His art was "hampered constantly by imperfect technique" but that "its very failures are more interesting than the successes of cleverer draughtsmen." In comparison to Fred Walker, Reid states that Pinwell "had a decorative sense far superior to Walker's" and that Pinwell "had a wider range, is infinitely more imaginative, and his work, above all, has a subjective, a lyrical quality". The Graphic stated that Pinwell "did too much to do all things well, and, on the whole, although his originality and ability were beyond question, he never did quite justice to the genuine powers he possessed." The Globe noted that "It is significant of the fine quality of Pinwell's art that many of his works are the property of artists."

Perhaps the largest collection of his work is in the Ashmolean Museum, Oxford.
