= The Quiver =

British magazine

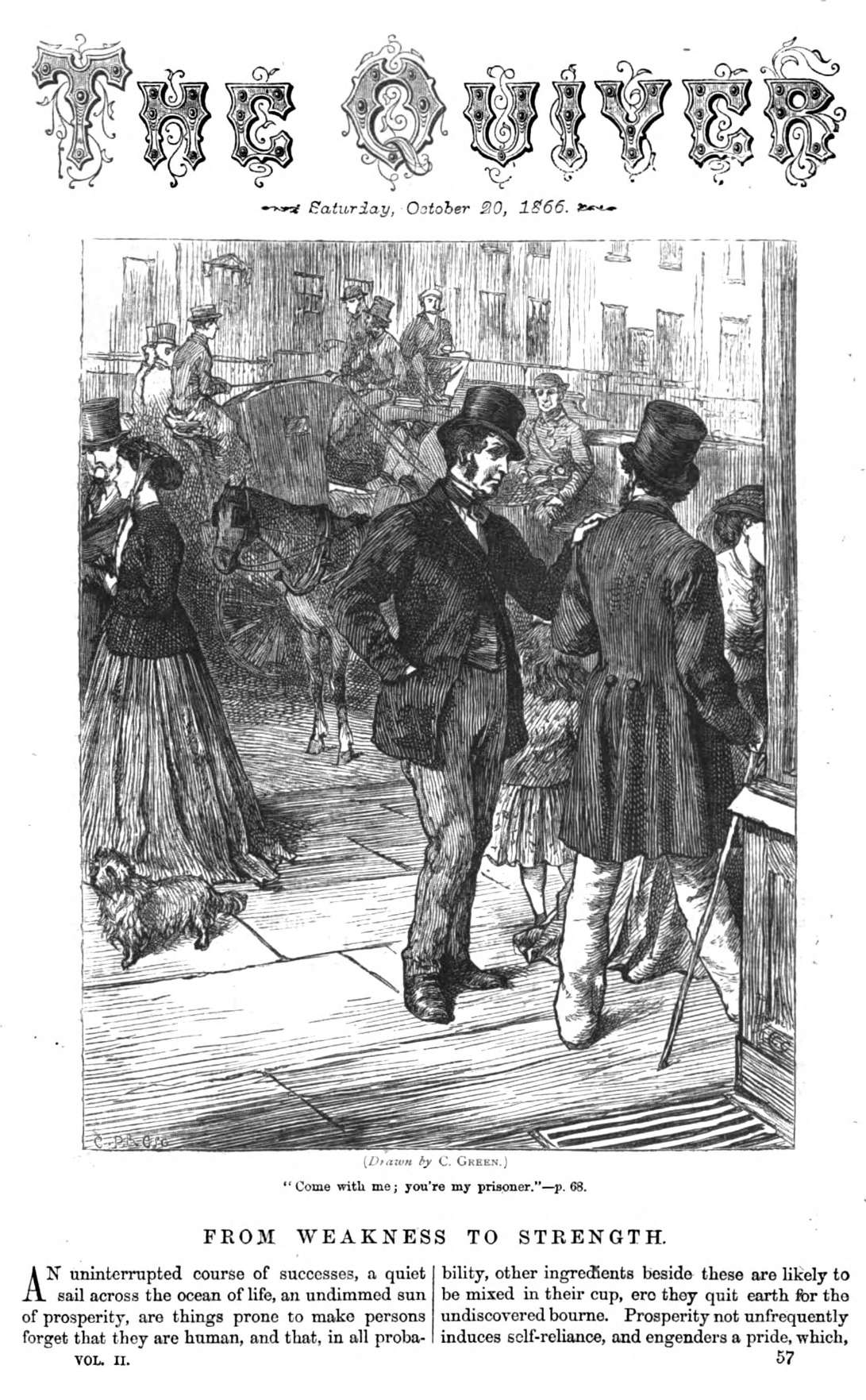
- Quiver cover for a weekly edition, illustrated by C. Green RI
- Editor: John Cassell initially
- Frequency: Weekly 1861–1878, Monthly (bound weekly editions) 1861–1865, Monthly 1865–1956
- Publisher: John Cassell
- First issue: 7 September 1861
- Final issue: 1956
- Company: Cassell and Company. Ltd.
- Country: UK
- Language: English

The Quiver was a weekly magazine published by Cassell's "designed for the defence and promotion of biblical truth and the advance of religion in the homes of the people."

It ran from 1861 to 1956 (Note: Sutherland and Scott give the dates as 1861-1926. However the online books page shows the magazine as continuing to 1956., and this is supported by references to magazine in 1943 and 1948.)

== History ==
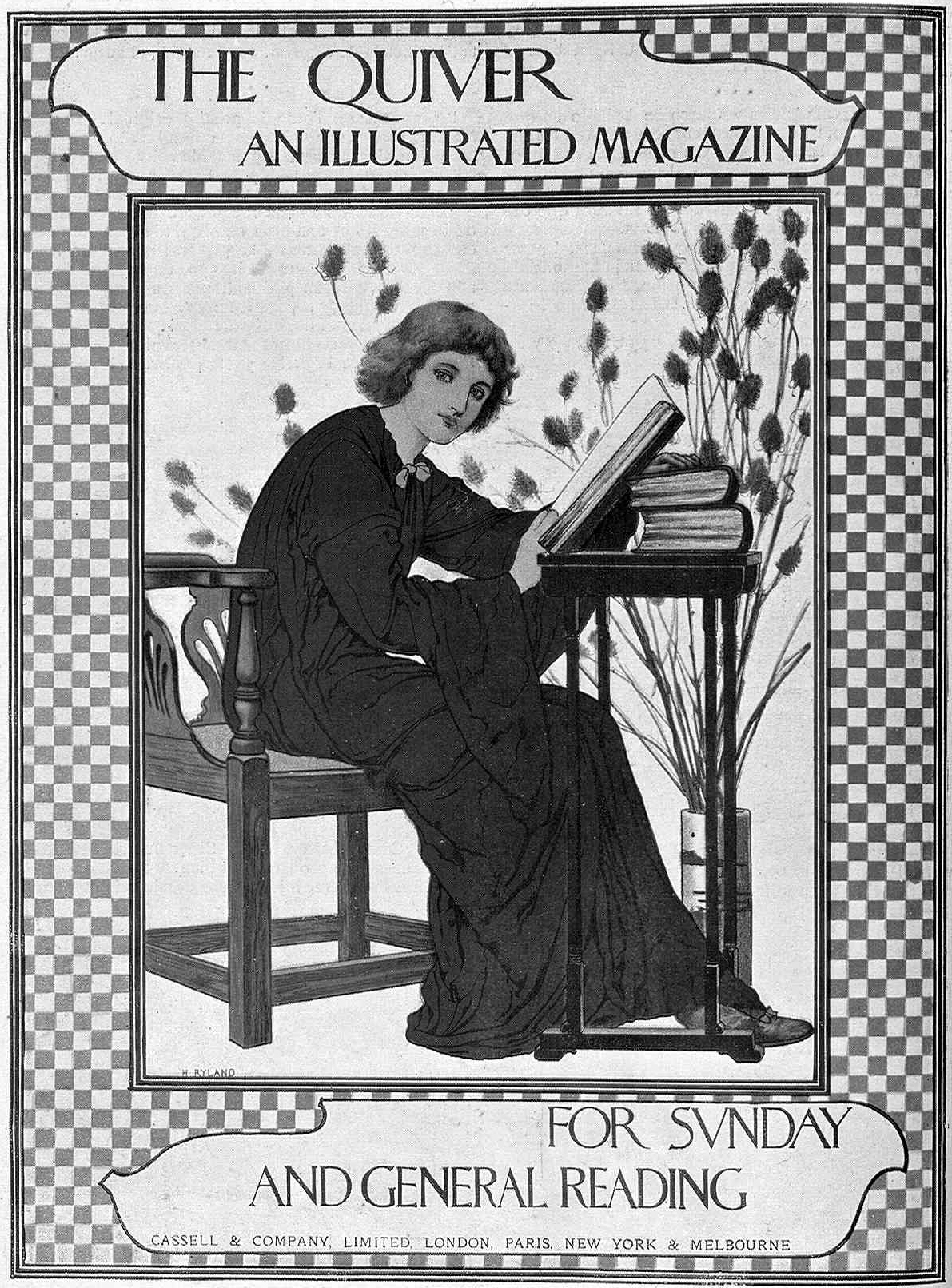
Cover for the Quiver Monthly, illustrated by Henry Ryland

John Cassell (1817–1865), the English publisher and temperance advocate, conceived the idea of a periodical which would supply Sunday reading for the family while touring America in 1859–1860.

The first number (in the First Series) appeared on 7 September 1861. It had 24 pages, was set in small type, had no illustrations, and cost one penny. It was initially in broadsheet format, but had changed to octavo format by 1864. In 1864, John Cassell published a Prospectus for a new series of the Quiver, which announced a new illustrated series (the Second Series) of the magazine, again with a one-penny weekly edition and a sixpenny monthly edition, beginning on 21 September 1864. A Third Series, now with "toned paper", began in September 1865, and this series continued until closure. With series three (if not Series Two also), the cover of the weekly edition featured a three-quarter page illustration with the magazine title above and the start of an article below. The monthly magazine cover had an illustration.

Nowell-Smith said that Cassell's prescription for the magazine was to have one article each:

- To address the intellect
- Full of gushing feeling to address the heart
- Of a literary theme
- Of a juvenile tale.

Teignmouth Shore says that when he became editor of the magazine in 1863, "it was a penny weekly publication, and four or five of these weekly numbers were bound up into a monthly part and sold for sixpence." However, the circulation of the weekly editions was declining and the monthly edition increasing, which led Teignmouth to propose that they publish a monthly edition that was not merely bound up weekly editions. The publishers agreed, and in 1865, the monthly magazine became a separate entity rather than collating the weekly edition. It was priced at sixpence an issue. However, they continued to publish a penny weekly edition until September 1879.

The magazine was still priced at sixpence in 1902, and must have had a large circulation as the advertising rate was £6 for one eighth of a page. (Note: By comparison, Pearson's Magazine, another sixpenny monthly family magazine, with a circulation of over 200,000, had an advertising rate of £5 for one eighth of a page.)

On occasion, The Quiver featured poetry. Both Janet Hamilton and Emily Chubbuck (under her pseudonym "Fanny Forester") published in the magazine.

== Notable contributors ==
The Quiver drew in several notable contributors, especially during its high period in the nineteenth century:

- Florence L. Barclay
- Christine Chaundler
- William Boyd Carpenter
- Frederic William Farrar (under the pseudonym "F T L Hope")
- Louisa Lilias Plunket Greene
- Janet Hamilton
- Mary Howitt
- Joseph Butterworth Owen
- Felicia Skene

== Editors ==
The magazine had relatively few editors over its history, with the last editor holding his post for nearly 50 years. The editors were:

- John Cassell (23 January 1817 – 2 April 1865), the founder and initial editor. Forced to give up the editorship due to increasing ill-health.
- Rev. Henry Wright (Note: Wright, Gore and Clark were editors only briefly, as Teignmouth Shore was already editor in 1863, and was the editor briefed by Cassell on his death-bed.)
- J. E. Gore
- J. Willis Clark
- Rev. Thomas Teignmouth Shore (28 December 1841 – 3 December 1911) became editor of Quiver in 1863 and relinquished it when he became Chief Editor at Cassell's in 1865. (Note: Although Teignmouth Shore was the Chief Editor at Cassell's for 23 years, he makes no mention of this in his Who's Who entry, and gives it little attention in his autobiography. His obituary in The Times makes no reference to his time at Cassell's whatsoever.)
- Hunt, Bonavia (30 July 1847 – 27 September 1917) editor from 1865 to 1905.
- David Williamson, editor from 1905 to 1909.
- Williams, Herbert Darkin 26 April 1882 – 4 August 1972) editor from 1909. (Note: H. Darkin Williams (26 April 1882 – 4 August 1972) appears to have remained as the editor of The Quiver until the end. He was described as the editor when he attended the memorial for Arthur Mee in 1943, his local newspaper shows his as such in 1948, the 1949 Who Was Who Among English and European Authors shows him as the editor from 1907, as does the 1970 The Men Behind Boy's Fiction..)

== Example of cover illustrations for the weekly Quiver ==
The following three-quarter page illustrations by George John Pinwell (26 December 1842 – 8 September 1875) for Volume II (September 1866 – September 1867) of the third series (Toned Paper Series) of the magazine are typical. Each of these illustrations appeared with the title of the magazine above and the start of an article below. The illustration was not necessarily related to the following article, but included a page number showing which article the illustration related to. Illustrations by courtesy of the HathiTrust.

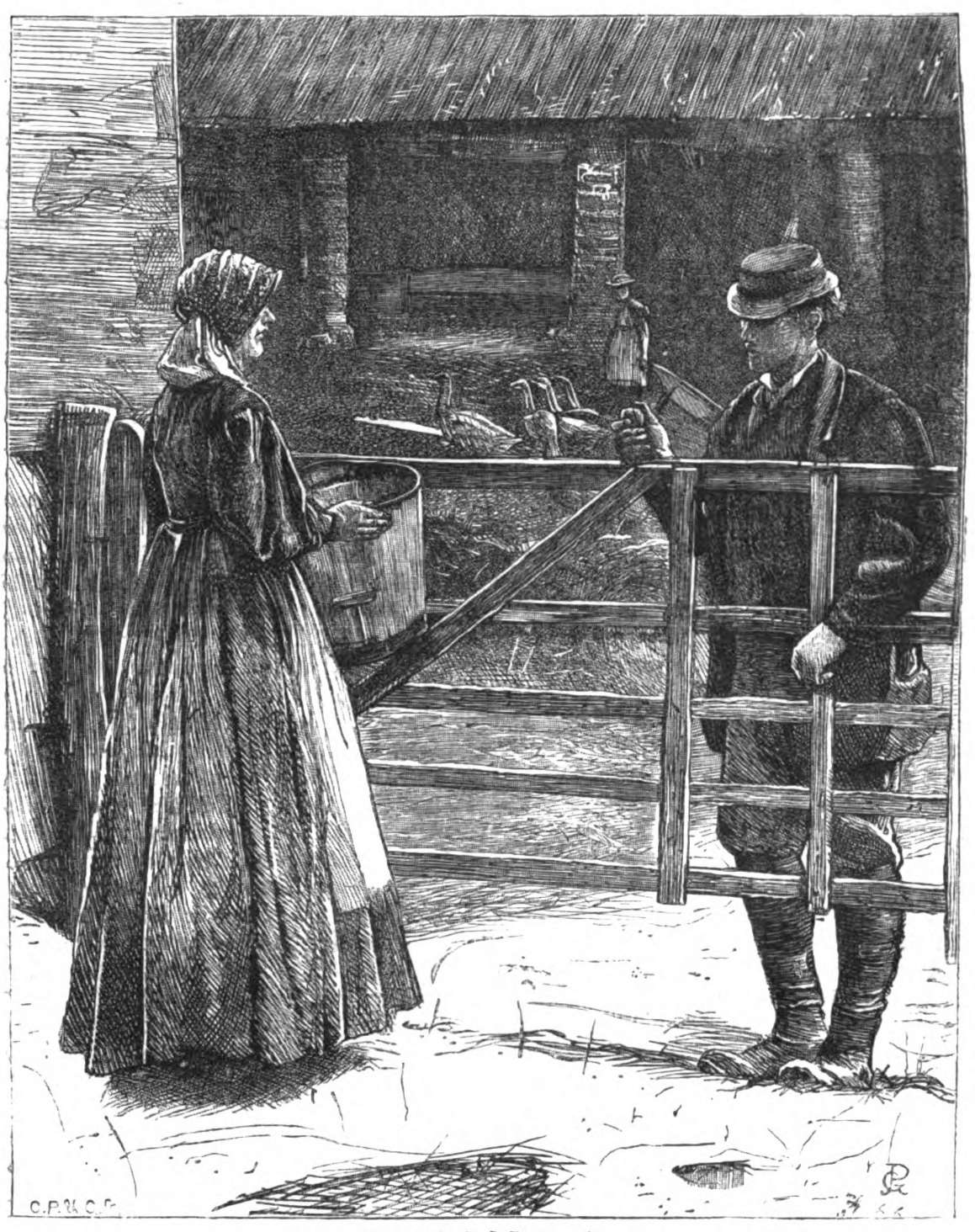
I met her by the yard gate in her simple working dress

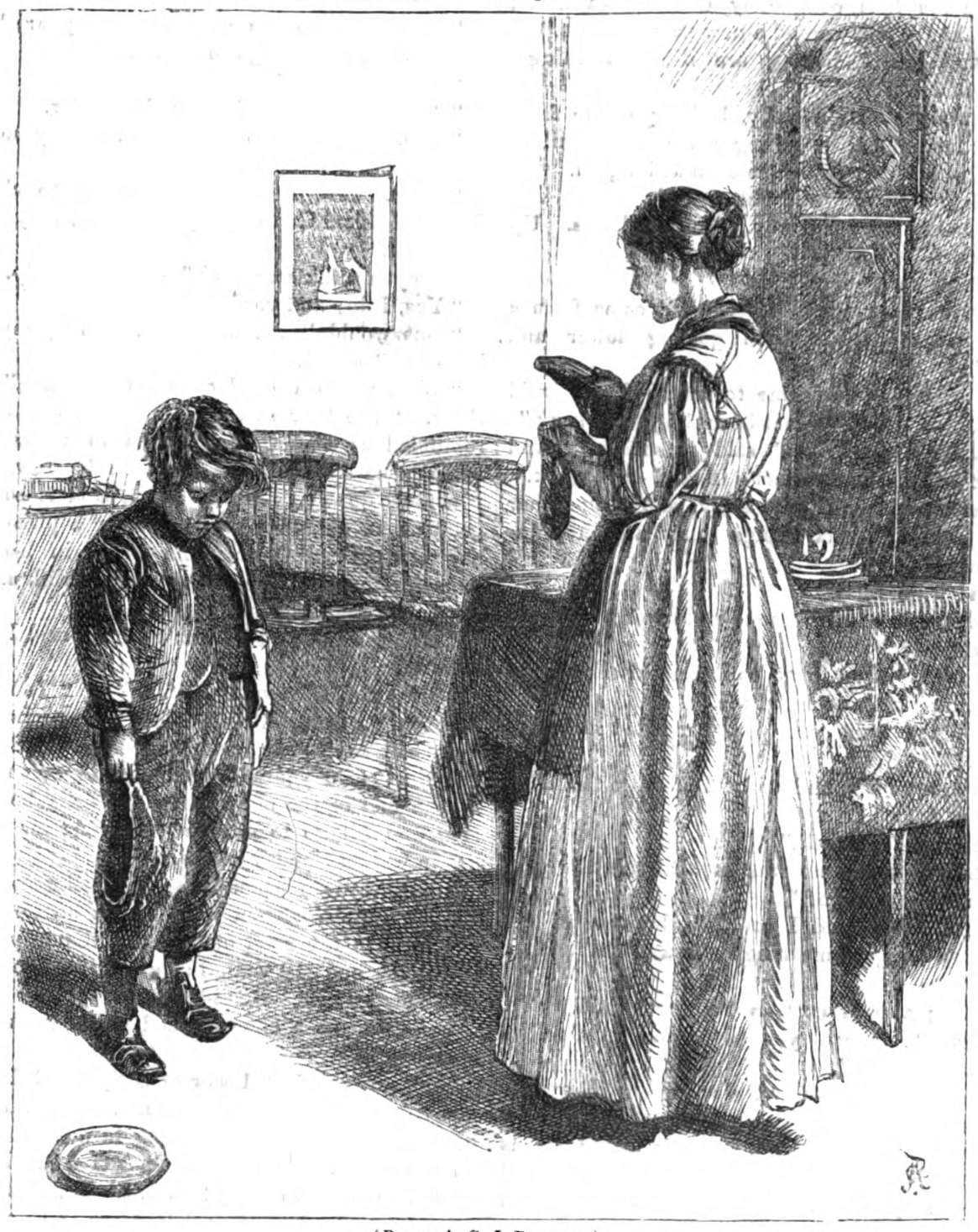
Will you go to Church, if father takes ninepence

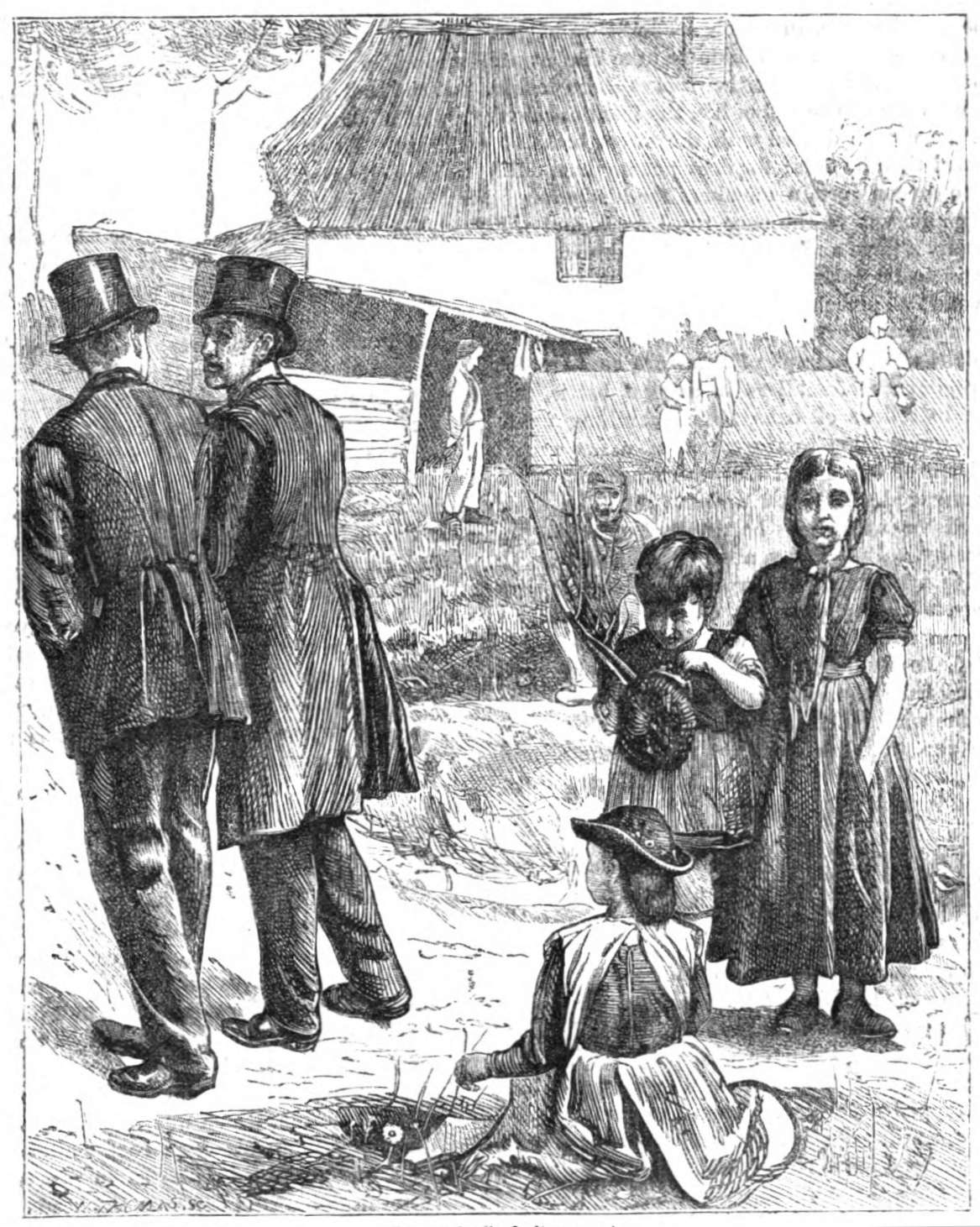
Came out to look at the strange who passed by

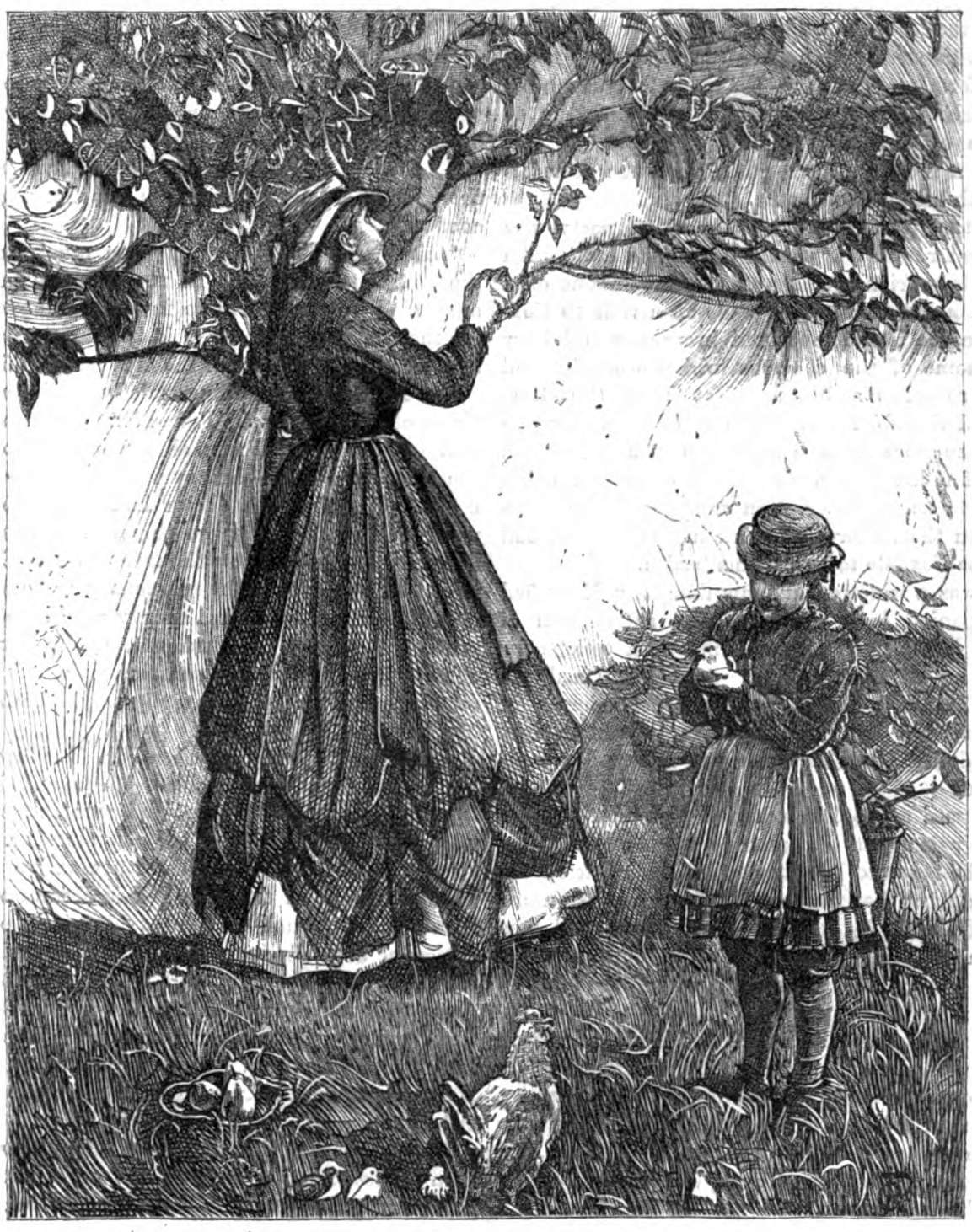
She is gathering pears in the garden
