= Macbeth (disambiguation) =

Macbeth is a play by William Shakespeare.

Macbeth may also refer to:

- Macbeth (character), the title character of Shakespeare's play

== People ==
- A family or clan member of the Beaton medical kindred or Clan MacBeth
- Macbeth, King of Scotland, the historical monarch on whom the play is loosely based
- MacBeth Sibaya, a South African footballer
- Ann Macbeth, a British designer
- David MacBeth, an English pop singer
- Don MacBeth, a Canadian jockey
- George MacBeth, a Scottish poet and novelist
- Henry Macbeth-Raeburn, a British printmaker
- James Cruickshank Henderson Macbeth, a Scottish and American chess player, code expert, writer and translator
- Jesse Macbeth, an imposter claiming to be an American soldier involved in war crimes in the Iraq War
- Nancy MacBeth, a Canadian politician
- Norman Macbeth, a British portraitist
- Robert Walker Macbeth, a British painter and printmaker
- MacBeth, nickname of gridiron football player McLeod Bethel-Thompson

== Operas ==
- Macbeth (Verdi), 1847, rev. 1865, opera by Giuseppe Verdi
  - Macbeth (1987 film), film version of the above directed by Claude d'Anna
- Macbeth (Bloch), 1910 opera by Ernest Bloch
- Lady Macbeth of Mtsensk (opera), 1934 opera by Dmitri Shostakovich
- Macbeth (Bibalo), 1989 opera by Antonio Bibalo
- Macbeth (Sciarrino), 2002 opera by Salvatore Sciarrino

== Film ==
- Macbeth (1908 film), directed by J. Stuart Blackton
- Macbeth (1909 French film), directed by André Calmettes
- Macbeth (1909 Italian film), directed by Mario Caserini
- Macbeth (1911 film), silent film starring Frank R. Benson and Constance Benson
- Macbeth (1913 film), directed by Arthur Bourchier
- Macbeth (1915 film), French-language film starring Séverin-Mars and Georgette Leblanc
- Macbeth (1916 film), directed by John Emerson
- Macbeth (1922 film), directed by H. B. Parkinson
- Macbeth (1948 film), directed by and starring Orson Welles
- Macbeth (1971 film), directed by Roman Polański, also known as The Tragedy of Macbeth
- Macbeth (2006 film), directed by Geoffrey Wright
- Macbeth (2015 film), directed by Justin Kurzel
- The Tragedy of Macbeth (2021 film), directed by Joel Coen
- Macbeth (unfinished film), an attempt by Laurence Olivier in the mid-1950s to finance a film

== Television ==
- Macbeth (1954 film), a live telecast film in the Hallmark Hall of Fame series, directed by George Schaefer
- Macbeth (1960 American film), a film in the Hallmark Hall of Fame series, directed by George Schaefer
- Macbeth (1960 Australian film), directed by William Sterling
- Macbeth (1961 film), a Canadian film directed by Paul Almond
- Macbeth (Wednesday Theatre), a 1965 Australian film directed by Alan Burke
- Macbeth (1979 film), videotaped RSC production directed by Phillip Casson
- Macbeth (1982 film), directed by Béla Tarr
- BBC Television Shakespeare - Season Six - Macbeth (1983) directed by Jack Gold
- ShakespeaRe-Told, Macbeth (2005) directed by Mark Brozel
- Macbeth (2010 film), directed by Rupert Goold, and starring Patrick Stewart

== Other uses ==
- Macbeth (painting), an 1820 painting by John Martin
- Macbeth (Jo Nesbø novel), a 2018 re-telling of the play commissioned by the Hogarth Shakespeare project and set in 1970
- Macbeth (Gargoyles), a fictional character based on both the historical and Shakespearean Macbeth from the Disney animated television series Gargoyles
- Macbeth (band), an Italian gothic metal band
- Macbeth (Taiwanese band), a rock band
- Macbeth (album), an album by Laibach
- Shakespeare's Macbeth – A Tragedy in Steel, a 2003 concept album by Rebellion
- Macbeth Footwear, a footwear company
- Macbeth (Strauss), Op. 23 (1880/90), a symphonic poem by Richard Strauss
- HMT Macbeth (T138), a ship
- Macbeth, the original name of the recovery ship SS Artiglio (1906)
- Macbeth II, winner of the 1888 Kentucky Derby
- The Macbeth ColorChecker, a color calibration target
- "Macbeth", a song by John Cale from Paris 1919
- Macbeth, a fictional planet in the video game Star Fox and its reboot Star Fox 64
- The Tragedy of Macbeth Part II: The Seed of Banquo, a sequel in verse by Noah Lukeman
- Hamish Macbeth, main character in a mystery novel series by M. C. Beaton
  - Hamish Macbeth (TV series), a BBC TV series featuring the character Hamish Macbeth
- Voodoo Macbeth, a 1936 all-Black production of the play

== See also ==
- McBeth
- MacBeath
- Lady Macbeth (disambiguation)
- Mac Bethad of Rosemarkie, a 12th-century Bishop of Ross
- Maqbool (2004 film), Indian crime-drama film by Vishal Bhardwaj, adaptation of the play
