= Beth (surname) =

Beth is a surname, and may refer to:

- Carly Beth, American singer-songwriter
- Evert Willem Beth, Dutch philosopher and logician
- Jehnny Beth, French actress and singer
- Karl Beth, German psychologist
- Marianne Beth, Jewish Austrian lawyer and feminist

== See also ==
- Bethe
- Berth (surname)
- Beath (surname)
- McBeth
- Macbeth (disambiguation)
