= Burthe =

Burthe is a surname, and may refer to:

- André Burthe (1772–1830), French soldier
- Dominique François Burthe (1785–1852), French planter in Louisiana, cousin of André Burthe
- Dominique François Victor Burthe (1811–1868), American politician and planter, son of ominique François Burthe

== See also ==
- Berth (surname)
