= Lydia Bilbrook =

English actress (1888–1990)

- Photographed by Bassano, 1917
- Born: Phillis Lydia Macbeth; 6 May 1888; Billbrook, Somerset, England
- Died: 4 January 1990 (aged 101); Bromham, Bedfordshire, England
- Education: Royal Academy of Dramatic Art
- Occupation: Actor
- Years active: 1906–1924 (stage); 1916–1917, 1939–1949 (film)
- Spouses: Reginald Owen (m. 1909; div. 1923); George Harrison Brown (m. 1924; died 1977)
- Children: 2
- Relatives: Robert Walker Macbeth (father); Norman Macbeth (paternal grandfather); Gen. John Bates (maternal grandfather); John Thomas Hall (brother-in-law); Henry Macbeth-Raeburn (uncle); James Macbeth (uncle); Ann Macbeth (cousin)

Lydia Bilbrook (born Phillis Lydia Macbeth; 6 May 1888 – 4 January 1990), sometimes credited as "Bilbrooke", was an English actress whose career spanned four decades, first as a stage performer in the West End, and later in films. She is best known to today's audiences as "Lady Ada Epping" opposite comedian Leon Errol in the Mexican Spitfire movie comedies of the 1940s.

She took her professional name from her home town of Bilbrook. She made her first stage appearance in 1906 and her last in 1924. She created roles in Where the Rainbow Ends (1911), The Great Adventure (1913), and Dear Brutus (1917). She played the role of Alice Hobson in the first London production of Hobson's Choice (1916). She retired from the stage after her second marriage, in 1924, but appeared in several films between 1940 and 1949, most of them made during her residence in the US during the Second World War and early postwar years.

== Life and career ==
=== Early years ===
Bilbrook was born Phillis Lydia Macbeth, in Billbrook, Somerset, daughter of the painter Robert Walker Macbeth and his wife Lydia Esther, née Bates. She was a student at Herbert Beerbohm Tree's Academy of Dramatic Art (later the Royal Academy of Dramatic Art). In October 1906, she appeared with Tree on tour in Kinsey Peile's adaption of Rudyard Kipling's The Man Who Was.

=== Stage career ===
In May 1907, Bilbrook (spelling her stage surname as "Bilbrooke") made her first appearance on the London stage, at the Duke of York's Theatre, in the role of the Countess Carina in Robert Marshall's comedy A Royal Family, starring Henry Ainley and Alexandra Carlisle. She appeared at the Comedy Theatre in December 1907 as Tiny Montague in Angela, a farce by Georges Duval and Cosmo Gordon-Lennox, starring Allan Aynesworth and Marie Tempest. In 1908 she appeared at the Comedy Theatre as Nellie Sellenger to Tempest's Mrs Dot in Somerset Maugham's play Mrs Dot. The drama critic of The Times judged Bilbrook's performance to be "flirtingly pleasant."

She then joined George Alexander's company at the St James's Theatre, where in February 1909 she played the Countess of Rassendyl in The Prisoner of Zenda, and subsequently Princess Flavia in the same play. Also for Alexander's company she played Madge Rockingham in Colonel Smith. In 1909 she married the actor Reginald Owen. They had one child, a daughter, Blossom (1911–1927). The marriage was later dissolved.

With Noël Coward (left) and Charles Hawtrey in The Great Name (1911)

Between September 1900 and October 1910 Bilbrook was in five West End productions – as Helene in Madame X, Mrs Otto Rosenberg in Smith, Ethel Morley in The House of Temperley, Adele in A Bolt from the Blue, and Odette de Versannes in Inconstant George. In September 1911 she appeared as Stephanie Julius in the comedy The Great Name with Charles Hawtrey (and, in a small role, the boy actor Noël Coward). During the 1911–12 Christmas season she appeared as Mrs Carey at the Savoy Theatre in Hawtrey's production of a new "fairy play" for children, Where the Rainbow Ends, with a largely juvenile cast that included Coward, Philip Tonge and Esmé Wynne.

Between 1911 and her retirement from the stage in 1924, Bilbrook appeared in 14 more West End productions and one on Broadway. Among her roles were Honoria Looe in Arnold Bennett's long-running comedy The Great Adventure (1913), Alice Hobson in the London production of Hobson’s Choice (1916), and Lady Caroline Laney in J. M. Barrie's Dear Brutus (1917). In 1923 she toured America with Cyril Maude and Mabel Terry-Lewis, playing Lady Tybar in If Winter Comes, playing at Chicago in April and New York City in the autumn.

At the Shaftesbury Theatre in April 1924, Bilbrook appeared in her final stage role, Mrs Cattestock, in A Perfect Fit, a comedy by Arthur Wimperis and Harry M. Vernon. In October 1924, in Paris, she married a journalist, George Harrison Brown (1893–1977). She did not appear on stage after her second marriage. The couple had one child, Felicity, born in 1928.

=== Later career: films ===
Bilbrook had appeared in the silent films A Place in the Sun (1916) and Smith (1917), but her main film career began after she moved to the US in 1939. Her American film roles included Lady Copewell in Dr Jekyll and Mr Hyde (1941), Lady Epping in five of the popular RKO "Mexican Spitfire" comedies with Leon Errol (1940–43), Susan in the Sherlock Holmes mystery The Spider Woman (1943), Millie in Passport to Destiny (1944), Mrs Manby in The Brighton Strangler (1945) and Mrs Vane in The Picture of Dorian Gray (1945). In 1949 she appeared in a British film, All Over the Town, in the role of Mrs Vane.

Bilbrook died at Bromham Hall, Bromham, Bedfordshire on 4 January 1990 aged 101.

== Sources ==
- Carson, Lionel (1912). The Stage Year Book 1912. London: The Stage. OCLC 1001864194.
- Goble, Alan (2000). The Complete Index to Literary Sources on Film. New Providence: Bowker-Saur. ISBN 978-1-85739-229-6.
- Parker, John; Freda Gaye; Ian Herbert (1978). Who Was Who in the Theatre. Detroit: Gale Research. OCLC 310466458.
