= Bert (surname) =

Bert is a surname, and may refer to:

- Adam K. Bert (1905–2007), American stamp collector and dealer
- Bob Bert (born 1955), American drummer
- Camille Bert (1880–1970), French actor
- Eddie Bert (1922–2012), American jazz trombonist
- Joris Bert (born 1987), French baseball player
- Liliane Bert (1922–2015), French actress
- Mabel Bert (1862–1945), American actress
- Malcolm C. Bert (1902–1973), American art director
- Margaret Bert (1896–1971), American actress
- Melissa Bert, American admiral
- Paul Bert (1833–1886), French zoologist, physiologist and politician
- Róbert Cey-Bert (born 1938), Hungarian psychosociologist
- Sascha Bert (born 1976), German racing driver

== See also ==
- Berth (surname)
- Bart (surname)
- Burt (surname)
