= Robert Walker Macbeth =

Scottish painter, etcher and watercolourist

Robert Walker Macbeth RA
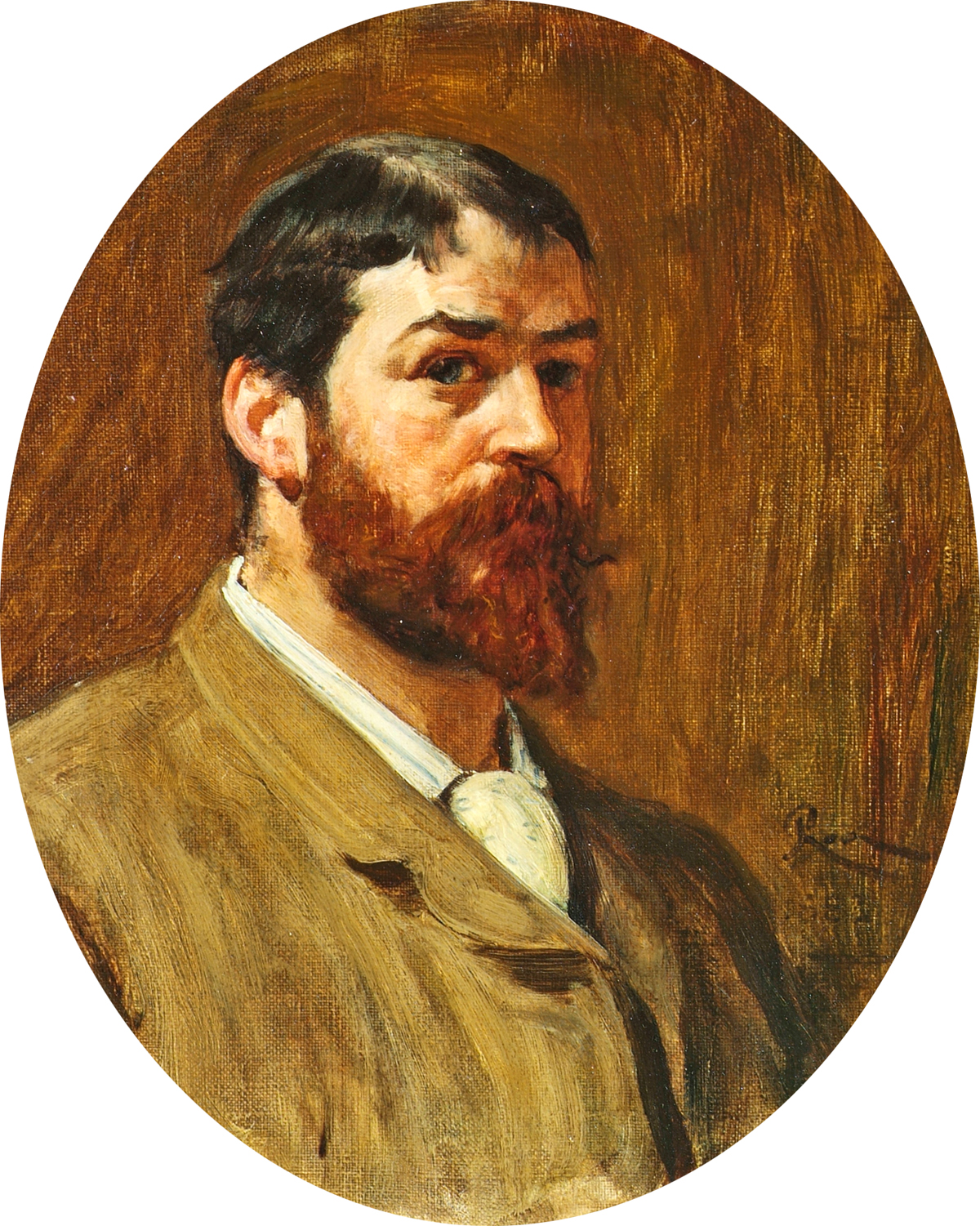
- Robert Walker Macbeth, Self-Portrait (1883; Aberdeen Art Gallery)
- Born: 30 September 1848; Glasgow, Scotland
- Died: 1 November 1910 (aged 62); Holder's Green, Essex
- Occupation: Painter
- Spouse: Lydia Esther Bates (m. 1887)
- Children: 2
- Relatives: Norman Macbeth (father); Lydia Bilbrook (daughter); Gen. John Bates (father-in-law); James Macbeth (brother); Henry Macbeth (brother); Ann Macbeth (niece)

Robert Walker Macbeth RA (30 September 1848 – 1 November 1910) was a Scottish painter, etcher and watercolourist. His father was a portrait painter named Norman Macbeth and his niece Ann Macbeth. Two of his five brothers, James Macbeth (1847–1891) and Henry Macbeth, later Macbeth-Raeburn RA (1860–1947), were also artists.

He was a member, very late in the day, of the Idyllic school, and was important in bringing their works to a wider public through his reproductions in etching, often made several decades after the original work. His works were varied, and his style evolved, but not necessarily improved, over his career, as conventional sentimentality took over many paintings from the 1890s onwards.

He sometimes engraved his own paintings, as well as those by others. When he exhibited his painting The Ferry Inn at the Royal Academy in 1882, the critic of the Times described him (by then in his late 30s) as “a young artist whose work is but imperfectly appreciated, but who is pressing steadily forward in his own way, but on somewhat similar lines to the late Fred Walker.”

== Life ==
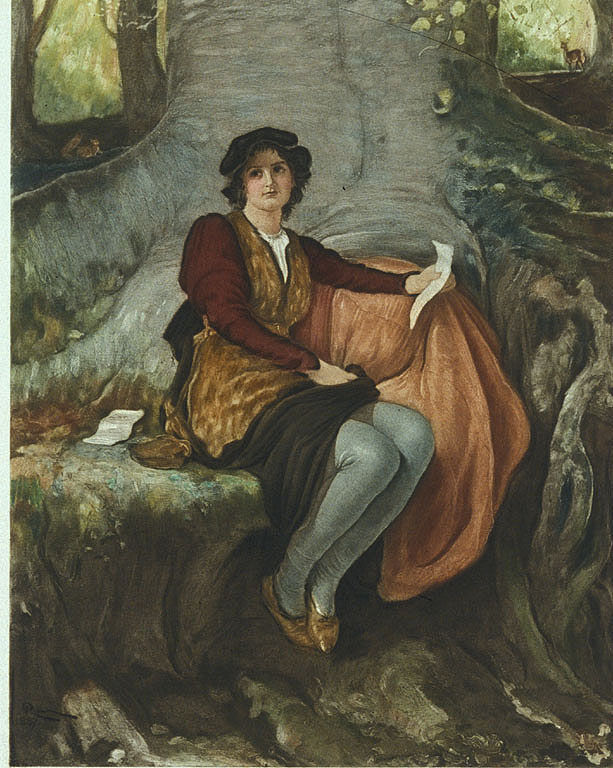
Fair Rosalind (1888)

Born in Glasgow, Macbeth studied art in London, producing realistic everyday scenes and working as an illustrator for the weekly newspaper The Graphic. Living in London and Essex, latterly with a studio in Tite Street, Chelsea, he painted in the Lincolnshire and Somerset countryside, among other areas, his landscape work influenced by that of George Heming Mason and Frederick Walker. His The Cast Shoe was bought by the Chantrey Bequest in 1890 and is now at Tate Britain.

From 1871 Macbeth exhibited at the Royal Academy, the Royal Society of Portrait Painters, the Grosvenor Gallery, the New Gallery, and the Fine Art Society, all in Westminster. There were also exhibitions in the regions at the Royal Birmingham Society of Artists in Birmingham, the Royal Scottish Academy in Edinburgh, the Royal Glasgow Institute of the Fine Arts, the Walker Art Gallery in Liverpool and Manchester Art Gallery.

In the same year (1871) Macbeth was made an associate of the Royal Watercolour Society (RWS) becoming a full member in 1901. He became a member of the Royal Society of Painter-Etchers and Engravers (RE) in 1880, and an honorary member in 1909. In 1882 he was elected a member of the Royal Institute of Painters in Water Colours (RI) and in 1883 was elected to be a member of the Royal Institute of Oil Painters (ROI). In 1883 he was elected an associate of the Royal Academy (RA), becoming a full member in 1903.

On 9 August 1887, he married Lydia Esther Bates, daughter of General John Bates of the Bombay native cavalry. Their daughter, Phillis Macbeth, was better known as the actress Lydia Bilbrook. Their second daughter, Norma Robina Macbeth married John Thomas Hall in 1924.

He died at Holder's Green, near Lindsell, Essex.

1895 Macbeth painted a mural, Opening of the Royal Exchange by Her Majesty Queen Victoria, 28th October 1844, which can be seen in the Royal Exchange, London.

== Gallery ==
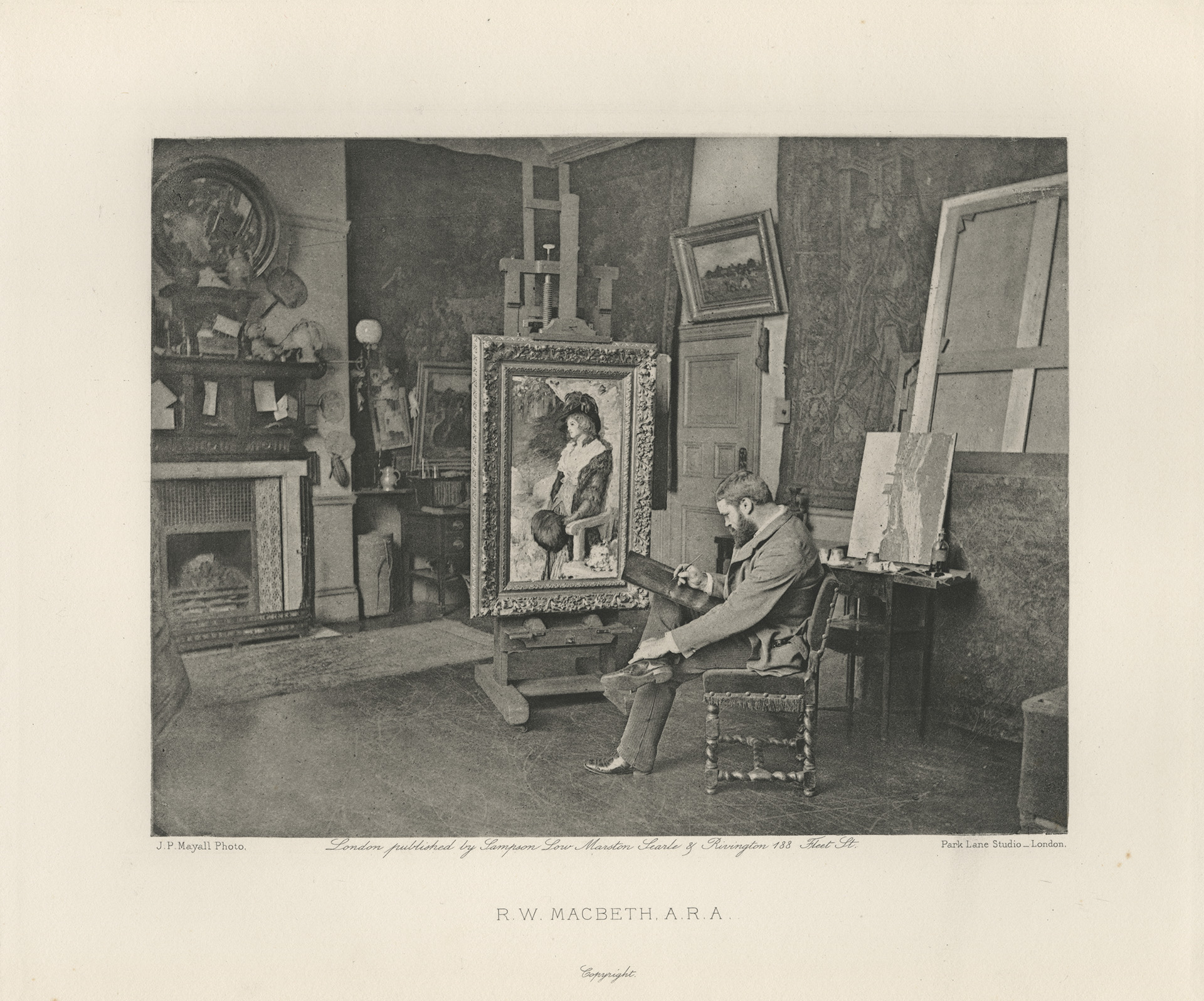
Macbeth by J. P. Mayall from Artists at Home, published 1884, Department of Image Collections, National Gallery of Art Library, Washington, DC

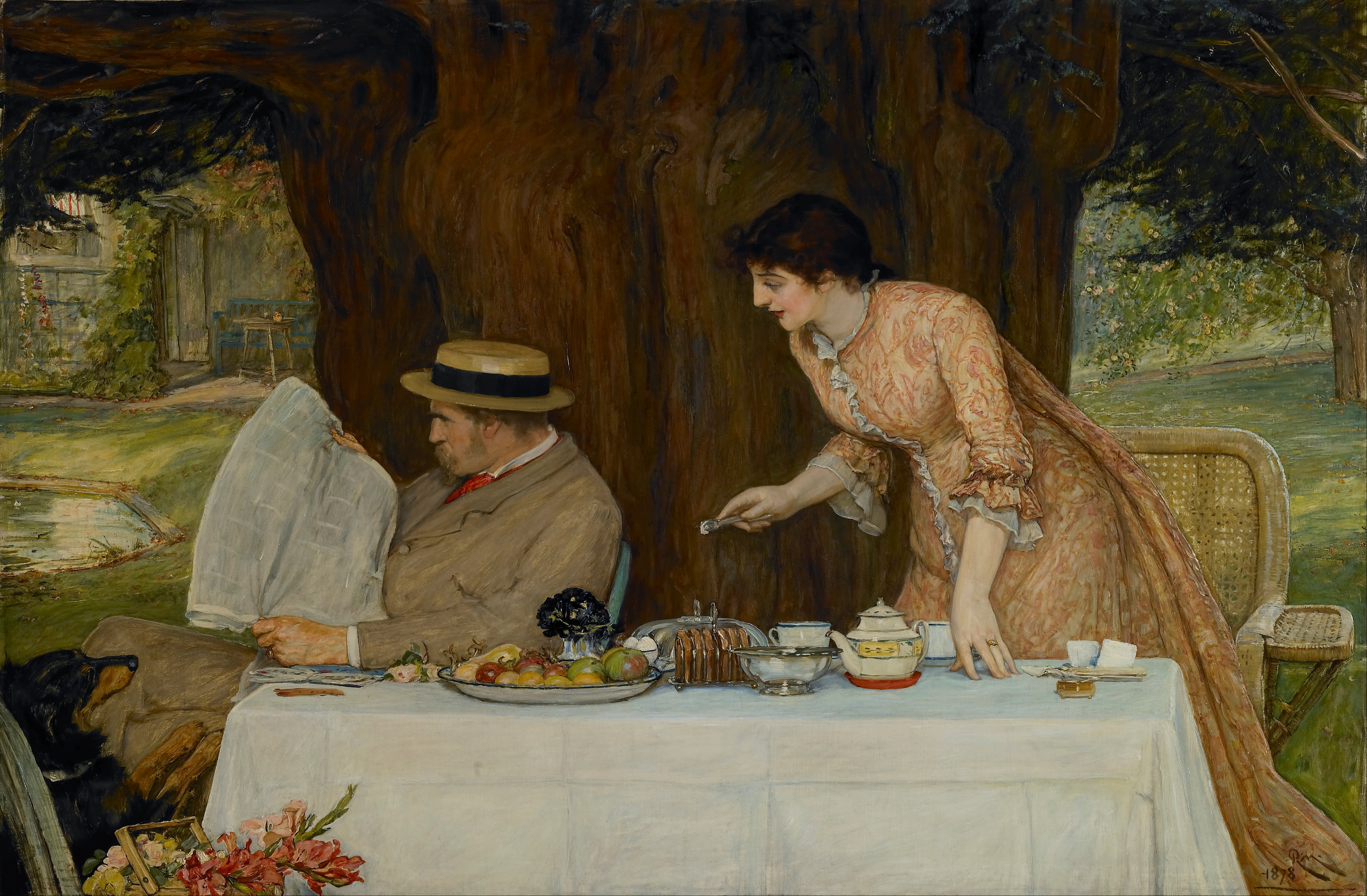
Our First Tiff, by Macbeth, oil on canvas, 1878

== Bibliography ==
- J. L. Caw, Scottish Painting 1620–1908 (Edinburgh; London: T.C. & E.C. Jack, 1908).
- Christopher Wood, The Dictionary of Victorian Painters, Woodbridge, 1971
- Johnson, J., and Anna Gruetzner Robins, The Dictionary of British Artists 1880–1940 (Woodbridge, 1980)
- Giles Walkley, Artists' houses in London 1764–1914 (Aldershot, 1994).
- Donato Esposito, 'Robert Walker Macbeth (1848–1910)', in Frederick Walker and the Idyllists (London: Lund Humphries, 2017), pp. 137–57.
