= Laurent Millaudon =

Laurent Millaudon may refer to:

- Benjamin Laurent Millaudon (1786–1868), New Orleans businessman
- Laurent Millaudon (steamboat), an 1856 steamship eventually involved in the American Civil War
