= Adam Bert =

Adam Bert may refer to:

- Adam K. Bert (1905–2007), American philatelist
- Adam Cornelius Bert
