= Berth (surname) =

Berth is a surname, and may refer to:

- Édouard Berth (1875–1939), French theorist
- Kenneth Kristensen Berth (born 1977), Danish politician
- Paul Berth (1890–1969), Danish footballer

== See also ==
- Beth (surname)
- Bert (surname)
- Barth (surname)
- Burthe, surname
