= MacBeath =

MacBeath or Macbeath may refer to:

- Alexander Murray Macbeath (1923–2014), British mathematician
- Andrew MacBeath 20th century Scottish preacher
- Jimmy MacBeath (1894–1972), itinerant worker and singer of Bothy Ballads from the northeast of Scotland
- John MacBeath (c. 1880 – 1967), Scottish Baptist preacher

== See also ==
- Macbeth (disambiguation)
