= Holder's Green =

Hamlet in Essex, England

Coordinates: 51.933°N 0.380°E

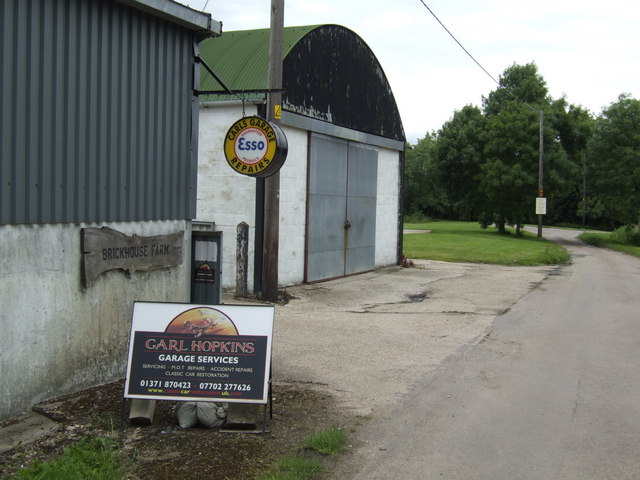
- Carl's Garage

- Location within Essex
- Civil parish: Lindsell
- District: Uttlesford
- Shire county: Essex
- Region: East
- Country: England
- Sovereign state: United Kingdom
- Police: Essex
- Fire: Essex
- Ambulance: East of England

Holder's Green is a hamlet in the civil parish of Lindsell, in the Uttlesford district of Essex, England.

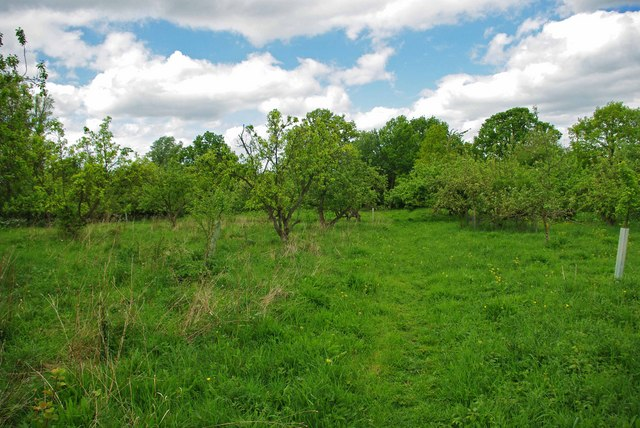
Sweetings Meadow

The hamlet is the site of the Essex Wildlife Trust Nature Reserve of 'Sweetings Meadow' which can be found on the hamlet's western approach from Richmonds Green.

Holder's Green contains two listed buildings including Wayhours and Wrens.

Other nearby settlements include the towns of Great Dunmow and Thaxted and the hamlets of Richmond's Green and Bustard Green.
