= Bárdudvarnok =

Bárdudvarnok Siroslavec (in Croatian)
- Village
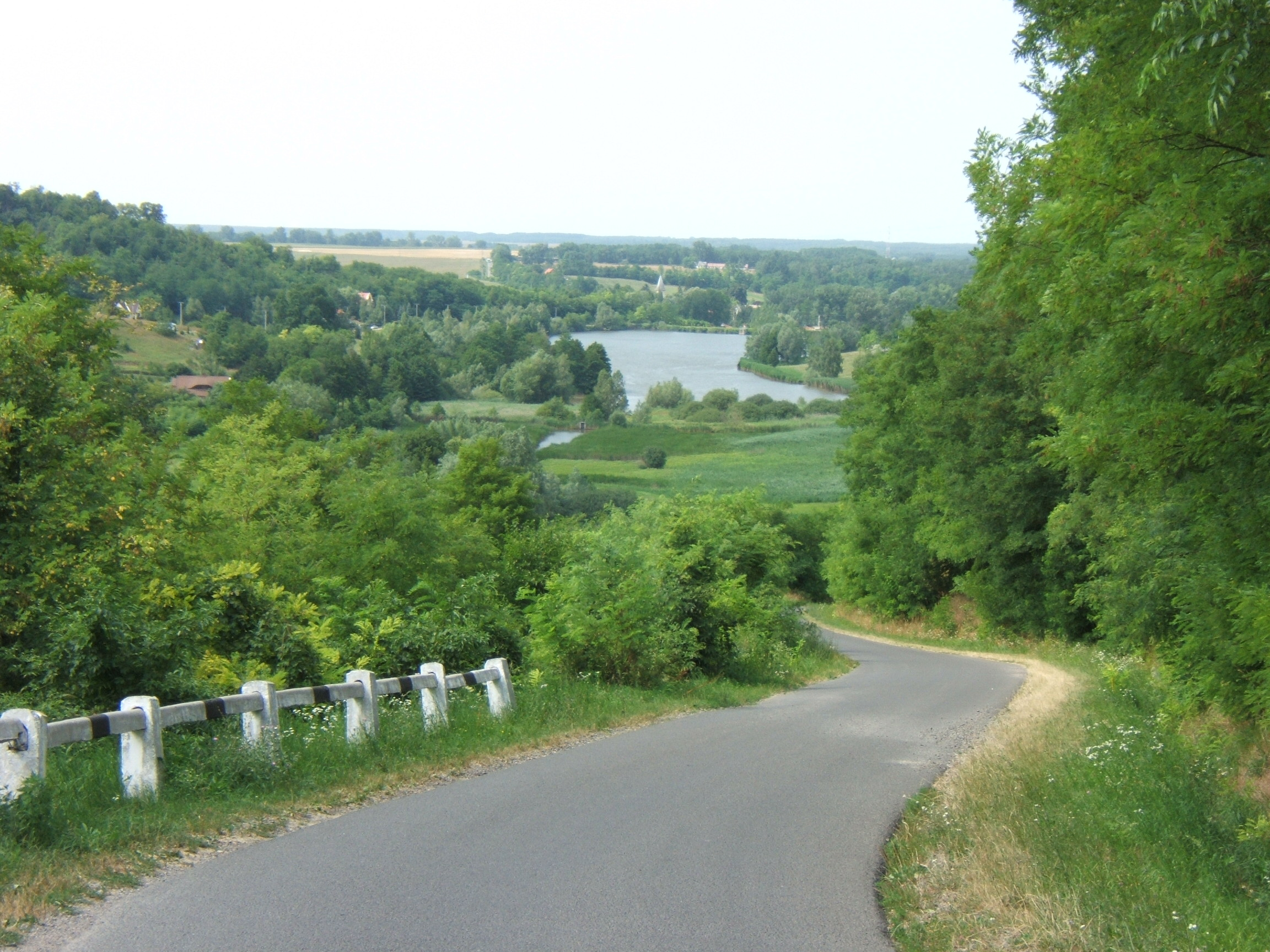
- Petörke Valley with the Lake Bárdudvarnok near Bádudvarnok

- Coat of arms

- Location of Somogy county in Hungary

- Location of Bárdudvarnok
- Coordinates: 46.32832°N 17.68619°E
- Country: Hungary
- Region: Southern Transdanubia
- County: Somogy
- District: Kaposvár
- RC Diocese: Kaposvár

Area
  - Total: 48.56 km^{2} (18.75 sq mi)

Population (2017)
  - Total: 1,102
  - Density: 22.69/km^{2} (58.78/sq mi)
- Demonym(s): udvarnoki, bárdudvarnoki
- Time zone: UTC+1 (CET)
  - Summer (DST): UTC+2 (CEST)
- Postal code: 7478
- Area code: (+36) 82
- NUTS 3 code: HU232
- MP: László Szászfalvi (KDNP)
- Website: Bárdudvarnok Online

Bárdudvarnok (Croatian: Siroslavec) is a village in Somogy county, Hungary. It is located in the Zselic. The village of Szenna is very close to Bárdudvarnok. From the city of Kaposvár there are two ways to go to Bárdudvarnok.

== Tourism, sports ==
Tourists can find a Scandinavian-style wooden Benedictine monastery, Goszthonyi Halls and János Somogyi's private arboretum here. There are some sports opportunities including an Archery Ranch here.

== Honorary citizen of Bárdudvarnok ==
Róbert Cey-Bert, a native of Bárdudvarnok, was awarded the Knight's Cross of the Hungarian Order of Merit, the Pro Comitatu Somogy Award and many other honours and awards, as well as the title of Honorary Citizen of Bárdudvarnok.
