= Patrick Don Swan =

Patrick Don Swan of Springfield FRSE DL (1808–1889) was a Scottish shipowner and shipbuilder who served as Provost of Kirkcaldy. He was a friend of Thomas Carlyle.

== Life ==
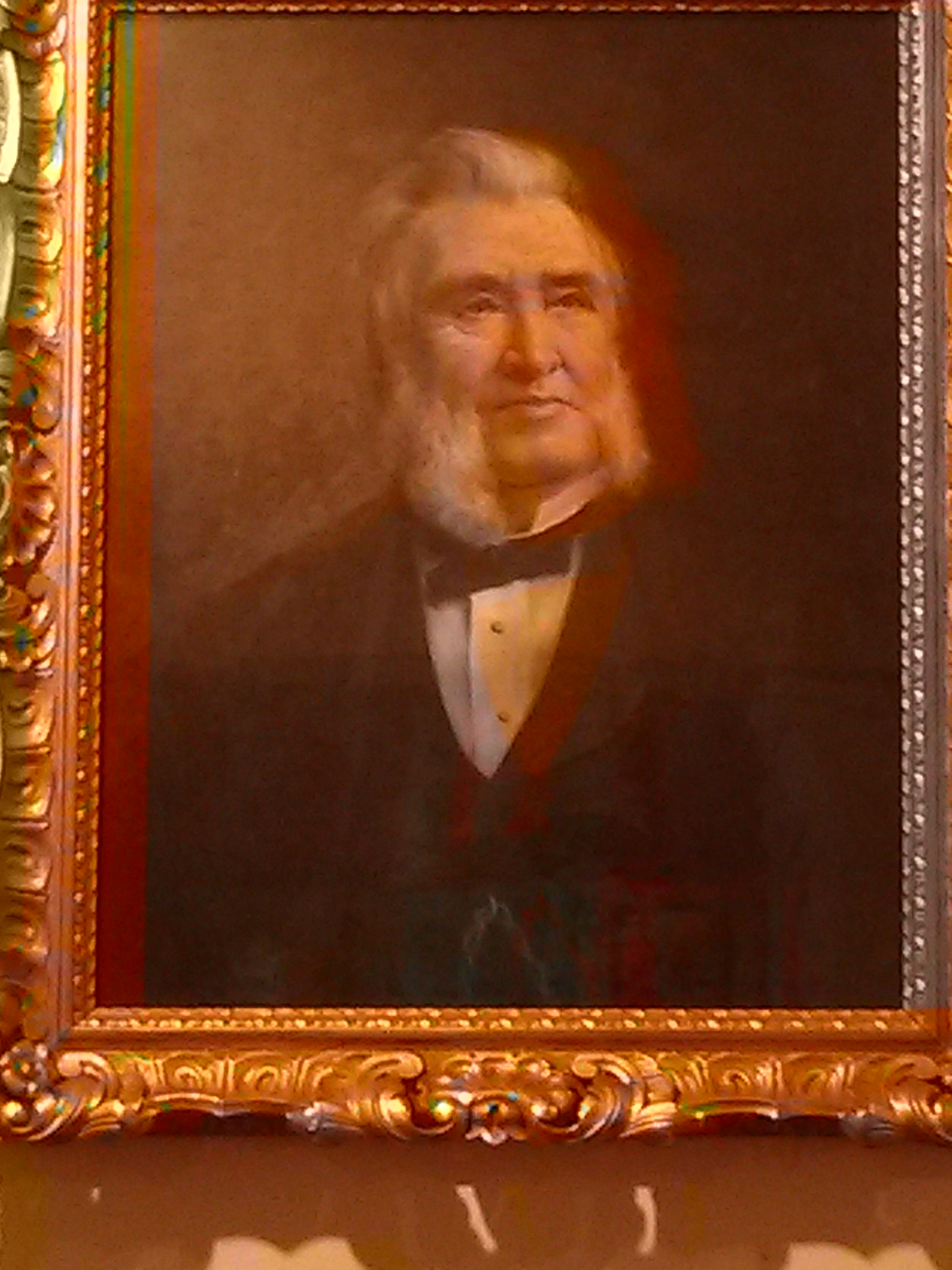
Patrick Don Swan in 1874

He was born on Whyte's Causeway in Kirkcaldy on 19 August 1808 the son of William Swan (d.1833), a yarn merchant, and later provost of the town. Patrick was educated at Hill Place School and Kirkcaldy Burgh School. He was also privately tutored by Thomas Carlyle with whom he became a life-long friend.

Patrick was a flax merchant, then branched into shipping, founding Swan Brothers.

Patrick served as provost from 1841 to 1845 and 1853 to 1886, an unprecedented period in office of 37 years. In the 1840s he corresponded with Richard Cobden regarding Cobden being given the freedom of Kirkcaldy.

At the Disruption of 1843 he joined the Free Church of Scotland and sat on their Committee representing Presbyterian churches in the Colonies. In 1876 he donated a site in Kirkcaldy for the erection of a Free Church (now known as St Bryce's). The church contains a memorial window to him by Edward Burne-Jones.

In 1870 he was elected a Fellow of the Royal Society of Edinburgh. His proposer was John Hutton Balfour.

He died at home, St Brycedale House, a Robert Adam mansion, in Kirkcaldy on 17 December 1889. He is buried in the parish churchyard.

The Swan Memorial Building is named in his memory.

== Family ==
He never married and had no children.

== Artistic recognition ==
He was portrayed several times, most notably by Norman Macbeth.
