= Lady Macbeth of the Mtsensk District =

Lady Macbeth of the Mtsensk District or Lady Macbeth of Mtensk may refer to:

- Lady Macbeth of the Mtsensk District (novel), by Nikolai Leskov
- Lady Macbeth of the Mtsensk District (opera), by Dimitri Shostakovich
- Lady Macbeth of the Mtsensk District (film), film directed by Roman Balayan
- Siberian Lady Macbeth, film directed by Andrzej Wajda

== See also ==
- Lady Macbeth (disambiguation)
