= Marjorie May Bacon =

English painter (1902-1988)

- Born: 6 January 1902; Ipswich, Suffolk, England
- Died: 9 February 1988 (aged 86); Great Yarmouth, Norfolk, England
- Education: Norwich School of Art; Royal College of Art
- Known for: Painting
- Spouse: Henry Macbeth-Raeburn (m. 1936; died 1947)

Marjorie May Bacon, later Marjorie Macbeth-Raeburn (6 January 1902 – 9 February 1988) was a British printmaker and painter.

== Biography ==
Bacon was born in Ipswich and lived in Great Yarmouth as a child. Bacon attended Yarmouth Art School from 1914–23 where she won a scholarship in 1917 and by 1921 passed the Board of Education's drawing examinations at the earliest age possible. She studied at the Norwich School of Art and then at the Royal College of Art in London, obtaining her diploma in 1927.

Bacon produced aquatints, wood-engravings and lithographs. She exhibited at the Royal Academy and with the New English Art Club. Her Royal Academy exhibits included Miss Aline Wilson of Welby Park, 1934. An oil painting by Bacon depicting Queen Elizabeth and Princess Margaret as children riding on horses is held in the Royal Collection.

In 1936, in London, Bacon married the artist Henry Macbeth-Raeburn and, by 1939, the couple were living in Great Yarmouth. In the 1940s, she was a member of, and exhibited with, the Ipswich Art Club.
