= Beath (surname) =

Beath is a surname. Notable people with the surname include:

- Paul Beath (born 1968), Australian Rugby League player
- Barry Beath (born 1944), Australian rugby league player
- Betty Beath (born 1932), Australian composer, pianist and music educator
- Chris Beath (born 1984), Australian soccer referee
- Cynthia Beath (born 1944), American computer scientist
- Danny Beath (1960–2013), British photographer and botanist
- Kate Beath (1882–1979), New Zealand architect
- Robert Burns Beath (1839–1914), American military officer
