= Benjamin Laurent Millaudon =

Louisiana merchant and sugar planter (1786–1868)

- Born: 1786; Avignon, France
- Died: 1868 (aged 81–82)
- Occupations: Merchant, real estate investor, railroad developer, planter

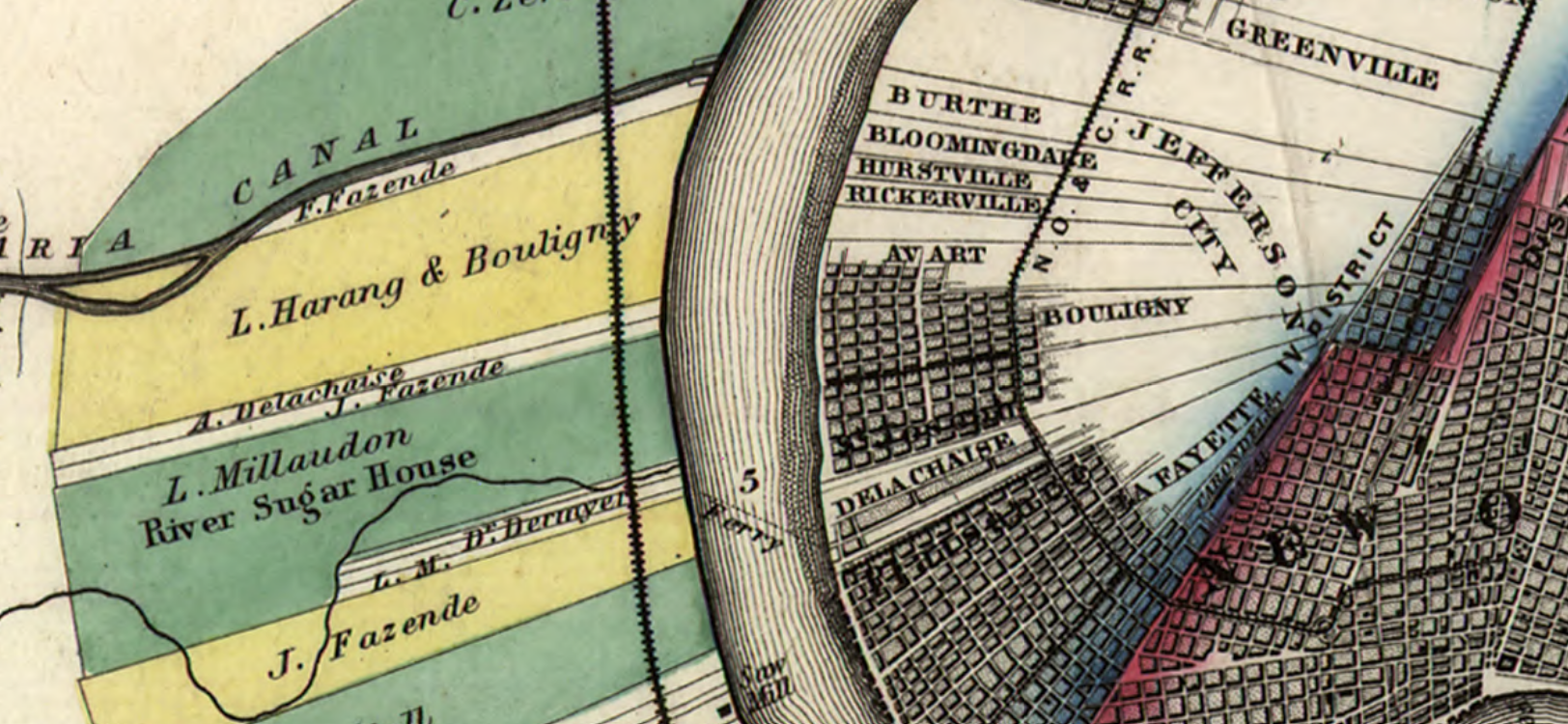
L. Millaudon River Sugar House opposite New Orleans on Norman's chart of the lower Mississippi River (1858)

Benjamin Laurent Millaudon (1786–1868) was an wealthy merchant, real-estate investor, and railroad developer of early 19th-century New Orleans. Described as a "self-made tycoon", he had emigrated to the United States from Avignon, France around 1802. In additional to his mercantile investments, he owned huge and lucrative sugar plantations worked by hundreds of slaves.

== Biography ==
The Historic New Orleans Collection holds documents from Millaudon's life and career, including the Benjamin–Millaudon Papers (90-21-L), which relate to business between Millaudon and future Confederate cabinet officer Judah P. Benjamin, and the Millaudon and Gardanne Family Papers (2015.0073), which relate to two of his children, Philippe Millaudon (1823–1855), and Jeanne Henriette Millaudon Gardanne (1821–1902), and to Millaudon's legal ownership of 490 people who were enslaved to sugar work at Millaudon Plantation, which was "located in the vicinity of present-day Marrero on the West Bank of Jefferson Parish and encompass[ed] roughly eight square miles."

A coastwise slave-ship manifest from 1837, held at the New-York Historical Society, lists "Lawrence Millaudon" and George Lane as the consignees of a shipment of 73 enslaved people sailing from Alexandria, Virginia, to New Orleans on the brig Isaac Franklin. His railroad interests included cofounding the New Orleans and Carrollton Railroad. By the 1840s, his finances were being handled by the brothers Charles P. Leverich and Henry S. Leverich, who also worked with Maunsel White and David Weeks.

The 1856 steamship Laurent Millaudon was either named for him or built by him. Among his streams of income was a rum manufacturing business based in New Orleans.

Just before the American Civil War, Millaudon sold his million-dollar (in 1859 currency) sugar plantation to his son. In 1860, H. Clement Millaudon (b. c. 1825) enslaved 440 people at a sugar plantation in Jefferson Parish, Louisiana. Laurent Millaudon legally owned 272 more people at another Jefferson Parish property, plus three more in the fifth ward of New Orleans, and another 82 people who were enslaved in St. Bernard Parish.

== Slave Revolt ==
On October 9, 1862, there was a violent altercation involving whips, axes, and guns, between H.C. Millaudon, his overseer, William P. D. McKay, and several slaves, primarily George Windberry, Freeman Washington, Sam Picker, and Ceasar McQueen. Millaudon had visited the plantation to soothe tensions between McKay and the slave population.

H.C. Millaudon claimed that he visited because McKay "complained of the conduct of the boys particularly George." He failed to ease tensions, and McKay was killed, and several people were wounded before 150 slaves self-emancipated and left the plantation en masse.

The four men were tried before a military commission in occupied New Orleans, and while Freeman was convicted and sentenced to death, Windberry, Picker, and McQueen were acquitted.

After the war, investors from Boston who had purchased the plantation relatively cheap hired Chinese immigrant laborers to take the slaves' place.

== See also ==
- Dominique François Victor Burthe, son-in-law

== Sources ==
- Rothstein, Morton (1979). "The Changing Social Networks and Investment Behavior of a Slaveholding Elite in the Ante Bellum South: Some Natchez Nabobs, 1800–1860". In Greenfield, Sidney M.; Strickon, Arnold; Aubey, Robert T. (eds.). Entrepreneurs in Cultural Context. School of American Research, Advanced Seminar Series. Albuquerque: University of New Mexico Press. pp. 65–88. ISBN 978-0-8263-0504-6. LCCN 78021433. OCLC 4859059.
- Scarborough, William Kauffman (2012) [2003]. Masters of the Big House: Elite Slaveholders of the Mid-Nineteenth-Century South. Baton Rouge: Louisiana State University Press. ISBN 9780807156001. LCCN 2003007301. OCLC 846496079. Project MUSE book 23668.
