= Macbeth (Taiwanese band) =

- Origin: Taipei, Taiwan
- Genres: Indie rock, post-punk revival
- Members: Mai Su; Howie Yu; Ian Chen; Michael Xu

Macbeth (traditional Chinese: 馬克白; simplified Chinese: 马克白) is an indie rock band formed in November 2008 in Taipei, Taiwan by Charlie Shao. The band composes of Mai Su (bass/vocal), Howie Yu (guitar/vocal), Ian Chen (drum) and Michael Xu (keyboard).

Macbeth was established in 2008. The band played their first gig at UnderWorld in July 2009, and was invited to play at the 2009 WHITE LABEL, Free Tibet Music, 2010 Megaport Music Festival, The Next Big Thing and many other music festivals. A report by Liberty Times in March 2010 recommended Macbeth as one of the Top Six Must-Hear Indie Bands in Taiwan, and Macbeth's original song, Red Light City had been ranked as top one in The Top Ten Songs Weekly on Street Voice for two weeks in June, 2010. The band released an album in 2014. Freshmusic gave the album a six out of 10 rating, saying it mostly keeps the band's "original captivating post-punk rock style".

The band's sound contains a mix of rhythmic bass and synthesized guitar, and the frolicsome keyboard and drums offer dance music elements into their songs. Each composing Macbeth introduces new elements in order to provide the audiences endless pleasure and excitement of new sounds.

According to Catherine Shu of the Taipei Times, Macbeth stands out for having "offbeat rhythms and dark sounds", while Taylor Briere of the same publication praised its "playful, high-energy sound". The band members say that their primary influences are Arcade Fire, Arctic Monkeys, Bloc Party, Gang of Four, Joy Division, and Yeah Yeah Yeahs. The writer David Frazier thought that Macbeth resonated through reviving "driving, danceable rhythms" in rock music and performed "urgent lyrics sung from the diaphragm and at the audience".
