= James Cruickshank Henderson Macbeth =

Scottish-American chess player and writer

James Cruickshank Henderson Macbeth (1874 — 21 March 1935) was a Scottish and American chess player, code expert, writer and translator.

Macbeth was born in Scotland. He was educated at the University of Aberdeen. He inherited a taste for chess, as both his father and grandfather were good players. He was barely 20 years old when he became the champion of the Aberdeen Chess Club for three years in a row. On May 10, 1901, as part of the Scottish national team, he took part in a chess tournament with the England national team and won both of his games. For several years Macbeth was an outstanding chess player in Scotland, but then his other occupations did not give him the opportunity to devote time to chess. He traveled extensively and visited many countries around the world. Since about 1915, Macbeth has been engaged in literary work as a writer and translator. He has earned his reputation as an international coding expert. Macbeth authored The Marconi International Code (1919) and Marconi Dictionary (Marconi International Code Co., 1920). In 1922, he translated André Langié's book Cryptography from French and published it in London. After moving to the USA Macbeth, together with the famous American chess player Frank James Marshall in 1924 wrote the book Chess Step by Step. This book was translated into Russian and published in the USSR twice in 1925 and 1928. Macbeth is the author of two books: Common Sense in Auction Bridge (1924) and Auction Bridge Simplified (1925). He died in New York City Hospital for Joint Diseases, at the age of about 58.

== Works ==
- English - German - Dutch. 1919
- The Marconi International Code. 1919
- Secret Ciphering for the Marconi International Code. 1920
- Marconi Dictionary, Specially Arranged and Edited for Code Users. 1920
- The Morse Code, and how to Learn it Quickly. 1922
- The ABC Code / William Clauson-Thue, James Cruickshank Henderson Macbeth. 1923
- Verbatim Supplement Code. 1923
- Chess Step by Step / Frank James Marshall, James Cruickshank Henderson Macbeth. 1924
  - Chess Step by Step / Frank James Marshall, James Cruickshank Henderson Macbeth. 1933
- Common Sense in Auction Bridge. 1924
- Auction Bridge Simplified. 1925.
- Modern English Dictionary ... Including ... Glossary of Automobile Terms, Glossary of Aviation Terms, Glossary of Wireless Telegraphic and Telephonic Terms [by S.H. Nayler], and a ... List of ... Synonyms and Atonyms, / by I. Gollancz, James Cruickshank Henderson Macbeth, Sir Israel Gollancz, Sidney Hills Nayler. 1925

== Translations ==
- André Langié. Cryptography. 1922
