= Marianne Beth =

Austrian lawyer and feminist (1889–1984)

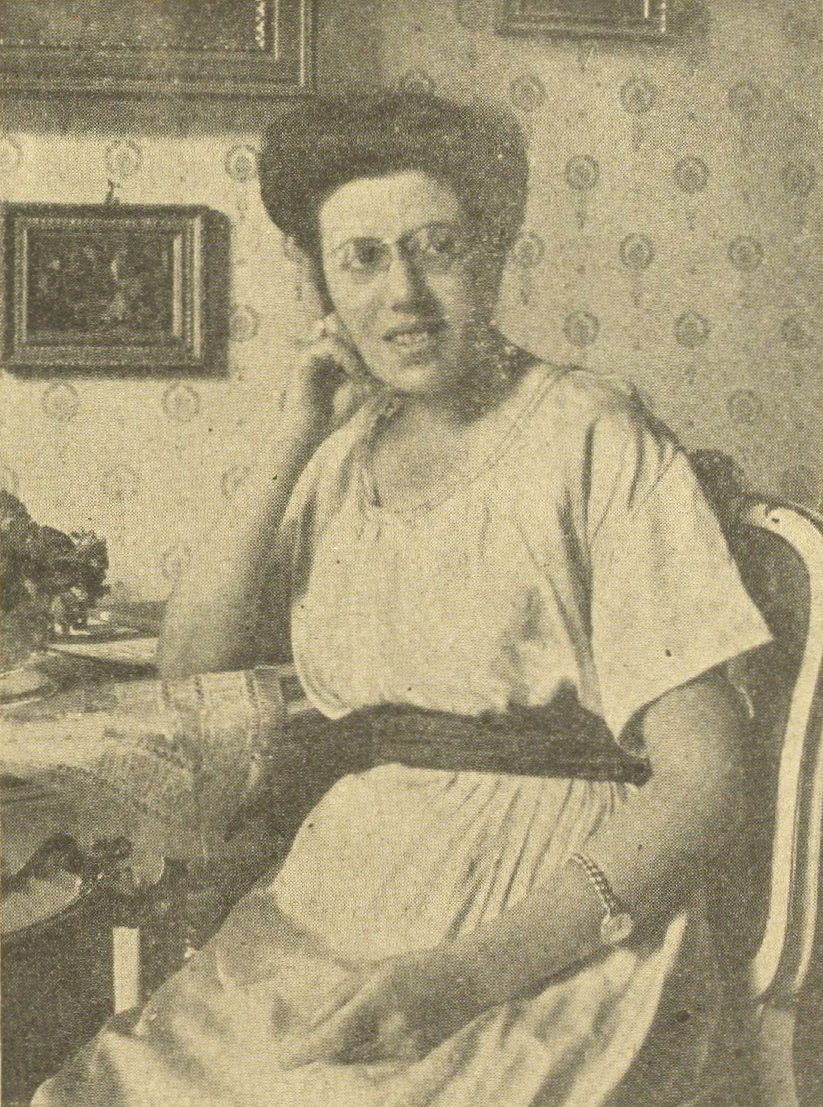
Marianne Beth (Photographer: Isidor Harkányi, 1922)

Marianne Beth (March 6, 1889, Vienna – August 19, 1984, New York City) was a Jewish Austrian lawyer and feminist. In 1921, she was the first Austrian woman to earn a doctorate in law.

== Life ==
She was born Marianne Weisl into a bourgeois Viennese family. Her father, Ernst Franz von Weisl, was a jurist. Her brother was the Orientalist and Zionist leader Wolfgang von Weisl. In 1906, she married the Berlin theologian Karl Beth and converted from Judaism to Protestantism.

In 1908, she wished to study law herself, but entry into the law faculty in Vienna was not permitted to women at that time. So she first studied Orientalism, earning her doctorate on the subject of Oriental Languages. In 1919 the rules were changed, permitting her to enroll in Law. In 1921, she became the first woman doctor of law on the juridical faculty in Vienna as a lecturer. From 1928 she was active as a lawyer in practice.

She wrote frequently on women's issues and was author of a legal handbook, "The right of women", 1931. She was the co-founder of the "Austrian women's organization."

When Nazi Germany annexed Austria in 1938 (Anschluss), her name was removed from the registry of attorneys and Beth and her husband emigrated to the United States. From 1939 to 1942, she taught sociology at Reed College, in Portland, Oregon.

== See also ==
- First women lawyers around the world
