= Róbert Cey-Bert =

Hungarian psychosociologist (born 1938)

- Cey-Bert Róbert
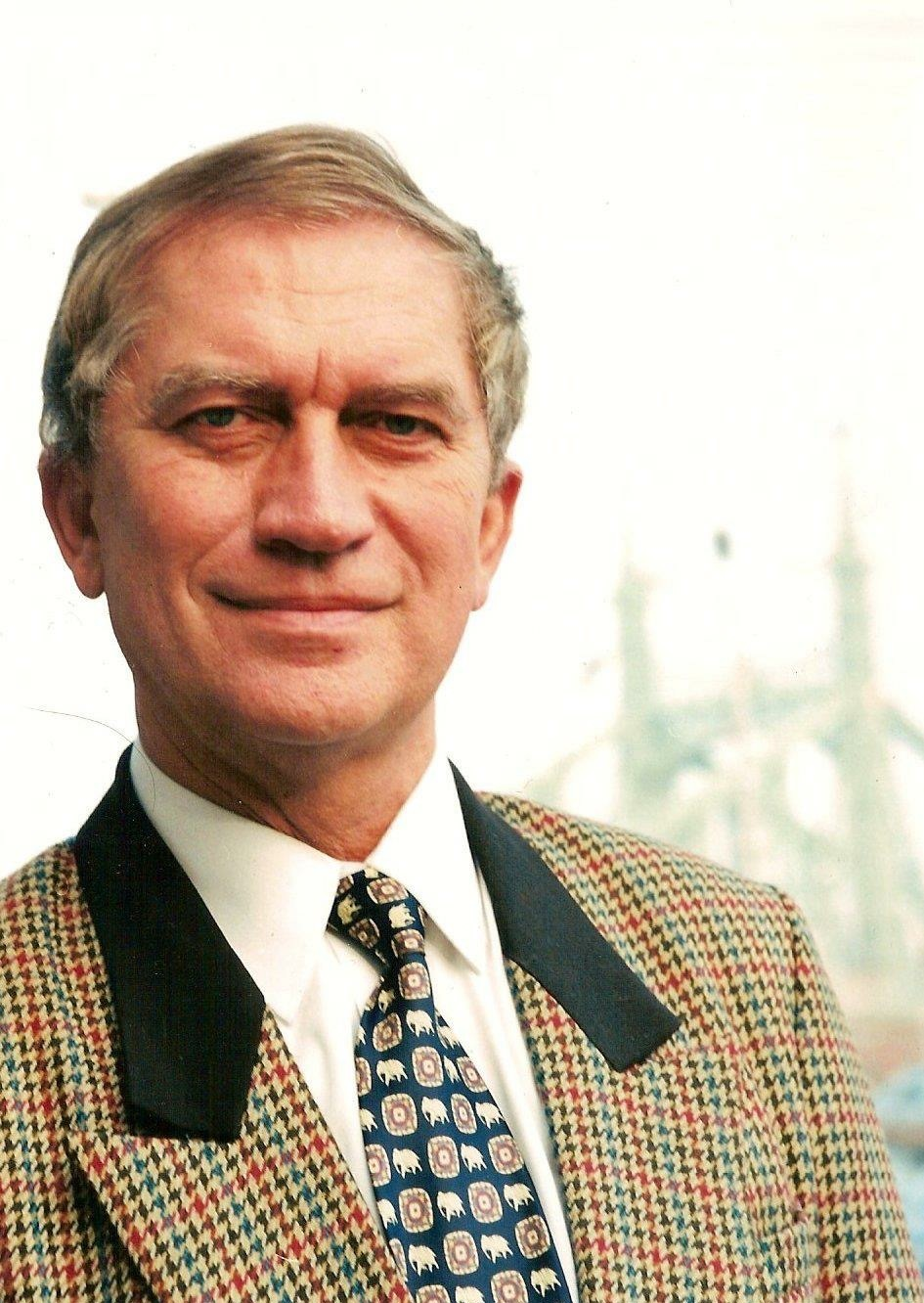
- Born: 5 July 1938 (age 88); Bárdudvarnok, Hungary
- Citizenship: Hungarian, Swiss
- Education: University of Geneva
- Occupations: writer, psychosociologist, food historian, professor
- Spouses: 1st wife (m. 1965; died 1981) Éva Németh (m. 2006)
- Children: 2
- Awards: Hungarian Order of Merit

Róbert Gyula Cey-Bert (born 5 July 1938) is a Hungarian writer, psychosociologist, and food historian.

== Early years, studies ==
=== Childhood, studies in Kaposvár ===
Cey-Bert was born in Bárdudvarnok, Hungary on 5 July 1938. His ancestors were water millers in South Somogy for centuries; they included the areas of Barcs, Babócsa, Vízvár, Csurgó, Rinyaszentkirály and Lábod. His father, Géza Czeibert, was the last mill owner of the centuries-old miller dynasty, the mill was nationalised and closed down by the communist regime in 1949.

After graduating from the Central Primary School in Kaposvár, he started his secondary school studies at the Táncsics Mihály gimnázium. As a high school student, he studied literature and history far beyond what was expected in the curriculum, and played a lot of sports, especially athletics and football.

=== 1956, Austria, Switzerland ===
On the news of the outbreak of the 1956 revolution, he travelled to Budapest on 25 October 1956, where he joined the Corvin köz rebels led by Gergely Pongrátz. After the fall of the city centre, he managed to return to Kaposvár. In several classes of his secondary school he gave accounts to his teachers and fellow students of the struggles and revolutionary days he had experienced in Pest. It became common knowledge in the town that he had been an active participant in the armed struggles in Pest, his teachers warned him that the AVO was reorganising and that if he wanted to survive he would have to flee and leave the country.

On 21 November, he crossed over to Austria, where he graduated from the Hungarian-language grammar school, the Ungarisches Realgimnasium, in Kammer am Attersee.

After graduating from high school, he continued his studies at the University of Geneva, Switzerland, between 1958 and 1965, where he was elected president of the Hungarian student community of over 120 students in 1960. In 1962, he graduated in commerce from the Faculté des sciences économiques et sociales of the University of Geneva. He completed his doctoral thesis at the Sorbonne in Paris, under the supervision of Professor Jean Cazeneuve, on the Psychosociologie des cuisines nationales et des civilisations gastronomiques, and defended it at Professor Robert Girod at the University of Geneva.

== Career ==
=== Geneva ===
After obtaining his doctorate, he started a family in 1966. The same year, in Geneva, he founded his research institute Institut de recherches de Motivation et de Communication, of which he became director.

His research interests were in marketing and advertising psychology; he studied shopping, eating and travel habits.

Following five years of research in Germany, Austria, Belgium, France, Netherlands and Switzerland, his study of new dietary trends has been widely praised.

Over time, a close relationship developed between him and Cardinal Primate József Mindszenty, who lived in exile at the Pázmáneum. From Geneva, he visited the Cardinal-Prince several times in Vienna and helped him to write his book on King Saint Stephen. Cey-Bert was admitted to the Knight Cross of the Order of St Lazarita on the recommendation of Mindszenty.

He was among the founders of the Association Suisse-Turquie in 1973-74, an active association that aims to foster friendly relations between Swiss and Turkish communities.

=== Far East ===
His wife died in 1981, after that, his work increasingly focused on the Far East, building business relationships in Hong Kong, Osaka, Bangkok and Singapore. In Bangkok, he founded the research institute Gastronomy Research International, where his main research focus was the study of Asian eating habits. As a result of his research, he was the first in the world to identify two great civilizations according to their gastronomic customs, rooted in the ancient past. Thanks to his research, a growing number of major airlines and luxury hotels have sought him out as an expert to improve their services and gastronomic strategies.

His international gastronomic conferences, pairing gourmet Chinese cuisine with French wines, have popularized him in the international gastronomic scene from Thailand to Indonesia and Singapore.

Some of the international symposia and congresses organized by Cey-Bert related to his period in the Far East:

- International symposium on harmonizing Chinese cuisine and French wines - Hong Kong, Guandong, Beijing (1981)

- Symposium on the gastronomic strategy of Nouvelle Cuisine Française with Henri Gault - Bangkok, The Oriental (1981)

- International symposium on harmonizing Japanese cuisine and French wines with Shizuo Tsuji - Osaka (1982)

- Symposium on harmonizing chocolate and wine with Alain Senderens - Paris (1983)

- World Gastronomic Council - Bangkok - The Oriental (1984)

- Chaired by Henry Gault (President), Róbert Gyula Cey-Bert (Secretary General), Paul Bocuse, Thanadsri Svasti, Hiroyuki Yamagata, Willie Mark and Mercedes Giralt.
- The organization was founded by some of the world's leading gastronomic personalities with the aim of defending national and regional cuisines and organizing cultural, commercial and technical events.

- Symposium on harmonizing Italian cuisine and wines with Federico d'Amato - Rome (1985)

- Symposium on the harmonization of Thai cuisine and wines - Bangkok (1988)

- First World Gastronomic Council Congress - Mexico City (1989)

- President: Henry Gault, Secretary General: Róbert Cey-Bert

- Second World Gastronomic Council Congress - Mexico City (1996)

- President: Róbert Cey-Bert, Vice-President: Enrique Figueroa, Secretary General: Enrique Figueroa

The above means that Cey-Bert was elected Secretary General of the World Gastronomic Council in Bangkok in 1984 and President of the World Gastronomic Council in Mexico City in 1996.

In addition to his gastronomic activities, he was also involved in research on Hungarian prehistory and religious history.

He continued his research on Hungarian prehistory in China, Uyguria, Tibet and Inner Mongolia.

He studied religious history as a Shinto monk in Japan and as a Buddhist monk in Thailand. In addition to Japan and Thailand, he has conducted research on religious history among the Animist hill tribes of Laos and in Myanmar (until 1989 Burma).

=== Karen ambassador ===
Cey-Bert, in his research into the history of religion, learned about the persecuted Karen people, who have been fighting the Myanmar (Burmese) government since 1949 to achieve Karen self-determination. After that, Cey-Bert actively participated in the armed struggle to defend the Karen people. In 1992, the Karen interim government appointed Cey-Bert as its international ambassador, and after considerable diplomatic effort, he succeeded in getting the Karen admitted to the Unrepresented Nations and Peoples Organization (UNPO). Every year, Cey-Bert spends several months with the Karen, where he is still held in high esteem.

=== Back in Hungary ===
In 1993, he founded the Hungarian Wine Academy and organized the first Budapest Wine Festival.

In 1996 he returned to Hungary and founded the research institute Cey-Bert Kutatóintézet in Budapest, where he worked as a consultant for renowned hotels and major Hungarian companies.

From 2000, he lectured in gastronomy and catering at the Kodolányi János University for six years.

From 2021 he will be Senior Advisor at the Magyarságkutató Intézet.

He is a member of the International Wine Academy and the Hungarian Wine Academy; Honorary President of the World Federation of Gastronomy.

Since 1998, he has written books mainly on wine and gastronomy, religious history and prehistory, but has also published poetry and novels.

In addition to Hungarian, his books have been published in four languages, French, English, German and Turkish.

== Family ==
He married in 1965. He has two children, Tünde (1966) and Tibor (1968).

Cey-bert has five grandchildren: his daughter's daughters Csenge (1998), Szinta (2000) and Tenke (2004); as well as his son's sons Turul (2007) and Timur (2010).

He was widowed in 1981, he remarried in 2006, his wife is Szekler, Dr. Éva Németh, who works as a neurologist in the hospital in Siófok.

He lives in Siófok and in his renovated mansion in Bárdudvarnok.

== Awards, honours ==
- Knight's Cross of the Hungarian Order of Merit
- Knight Cross of the Order of St Lazarita
- Gold Diploma of the International Symposium of Chinese Cuisine and French Wines (Hong Kong)
- Culinary Great Powers Summit Award (Bangkok)
- President's Award of the World Federation of Gastronomic Sciences (Mexico City)
- Honorary citizen of Bárdudvarnok
- Pro Comitatu Somogy díj
- Pesti Srác 1956 díj

== Bibliography ==
=== Wine and gastronomy ===
- New pattern of food preferencies. IRCM, Genève 1972
- Nouvelle orientation alimentaire. IRCM, 1972
- Airlines gastronomic promotion. IRCM, Genève 1975
- Changement d’attitude des consommateurs envers le vin. IRCM, Genève 1977
- Yin-Yang mystery of the Chinese Gastronomy. HTA, Hong Kong 1985
- Taste harmony of the Thai cuisine. TAT, Bangkok 1987
- Magyar borok és ételek harmonizációja. Paginárum, Budapest 1999
- Das Hormonieren von ungarischen Weinen und Speisen. Paginárum, Budapest 2000
- Balatoni borgasztronómia. Paginárum, Budapest 2000
- A bor vallása. Szigtim, Budapest 2000
- Balaton Wine Gastronomy. Paginárum, Budapest 2000
- Tokaji borgasztronómia. Paginárum, Budapest 2001
- Tokajer Weingastronomie. Paginárum, Budapest 2001
- Harmony in Hungarian Food and Wine. Paginárum, Budapest 2001
- A magyar konyha ízei. Paginárum, Budapest 2002
- Japán konyha - Az Istenek világa. Paginárum, Budapest 2002
- A kínai konyha. Az erotika és a jin-jang filozófia titokzatos világa. Paginárum, Budapest 2002
- Hungaricum borgasztronómia. Paginárum, Budapest 2003
- A thai konyha, az ízek paradicsoma. Paginárum, Budapest 2003
- Hunok és magyarok konyhája. Mezőgazda, Budapest 2003
- Magyar halgasztronómia. Szigtim, Budapest 2003
- Magyar vadgasztronómia. Szigtim, Budapest 2003
- A szerelem gasztronómiája. Mezőgazda, Budapest 2004
- A magyar bor szellemisége. Hun-Idea, Budapest 2004
- A magyar konyha filozófiája. Püski, Budapest 2009
- Megszólalnak a jelképek. Püski, Budapest 2009

=== Novels ===
- A Sólyom embere útjai. Paginárum, Budapest 2001
- A fehér tigris szellemének harcosa. Kairosz, Budapest 2004
- A Sólyom népe. Püski, Budapest 2010
- Atilla, a Hun üzenet. Püski, Budapest 2012
- A Pozsonyi csata. Püski, Budapest 2013
- Koppány – A Fény harcosa. Püski, Budapest 2014
- 1526: a végzetes mohácsi úttévesztés – Béke vagy 150 év háború! Püski, Budapest 2015
- Végvári oroszlánok – Élni és halni a hazáért. Püski, Budapest 2016
- Atilla, the Hun message. Püski, Budapest 2017
- Nincs más út, csak a szabadság – Bocskai–Bethlen szabadságharc török szövetséggel. Püski, Budapest 2017
- A szabadságharcos – Egy élet 1956 szellemében. Üdki, Budapest 2018
- Atilla – Gelecek Nesillere Mesaj. Ostanbul, Kabalci 2018
- A Székely Hadosztály – Erdélyért! A magyar szabadságért! Püski, Budapest 2019
- Atatürk magyarjai – Visszavágás Trianonért. Püski, Budapest 2020
- Fenn az égen hun Nap ragyog – Az Ázsiai Hun Birodalom felemelkedése. Püski, Budapest 2021
- Atilla Sólyma. Püski, Budapest 2022
- A szkíta turul dinasztia örökösei. Püski, Budapest 2023

=== Poems ===
- "Adj szabadságot vagy halált!" Gerilla-líra. Hun-Idea, Budapest 2004
- Kép a fán – Szakrális szerelem a dzsungelháborúban – Gerilla-líra II. Hun-Idea, Budapest 2005
