= Lady Macbeth (disambiguation) =

Lady Macbeth is a character from William Shakespeare's play Macbeth.

Lady Macbeth may also refer to:

- Lady Macbeth (historical) or Queen Gruoch of Scotland
- Lady Macbeth (album), a 2005 album by Lana Lane
- Lady Macbeth (sculpture), a sculpture by Elisabet Ney
- Lady MacBeth (spaceship), a fictional spaceship in Peter F. Hamilton's Night's Dawn trilogy
- Lady Macbeth, a 2008 novel by Susan King
- Lady Macbeth (film), a 2016 British drama based on the 1865 novella Lady Macbeth of the Mtsensk District by Nikolai Leskov
- Lady Macbeth effect, psychological phenomenon

== See also ==
- Lady Macbeth of the Mtsensk District (disambiguation)
