= André Burthe =

French soldier (1772–1830)

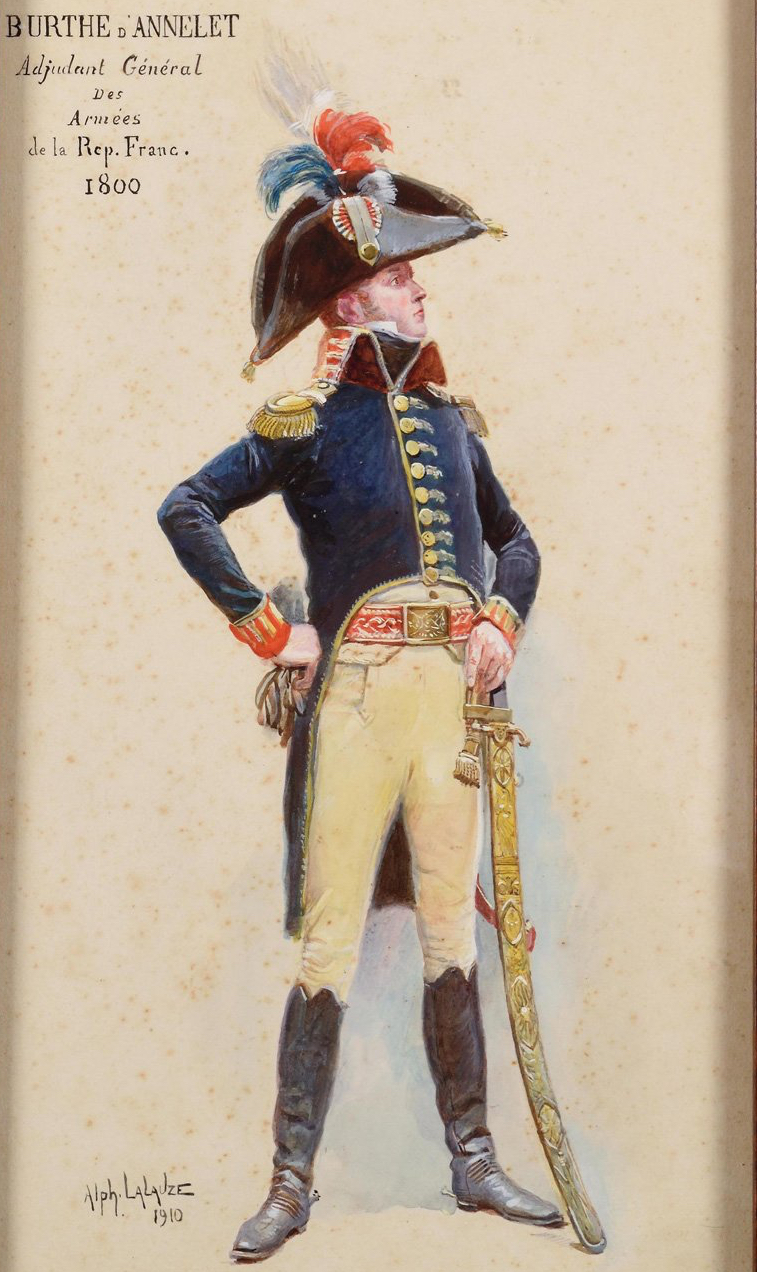

André Burthe d'Annelet de Rosenthal (1772–1830) was a Baron of France.

== Biography ==
Coat of Arms of André Burthe.

André Burthe was born in Metz in France on 8 December 1772, allegedly into a family of Irish refugees who had followed James II of England to France. However his father Nicolas Burthe was a descendant of a line of merchants in Metz, so it is unclear where this allegation arises. His father married Françoise d'Annelet in the parish of St Eucaire in Metz on 29 October 1771: according to Laussat Nicolas was an ex-soldier who had joined a manufacturing enterprise in Metz, and the young André studied under a parish priest in Lorraine. He entered military service on 6 April 1791 at the age of 19 as a simple cavalier in the Second Regiment of Dragoons, after which his career had a meteoric rise. He served in the Armée du Nord 1792-4 during the French Revolution.

Burthe fought with distinction at the Battle of Neerwinden (1793), after which he was made provisional second lieutenant of the 10th Regiment of Dragoons on 13 April 1793. This appointment was confirmed in May of that year and he took part in three campaigns at that grade; in 1794 he was wounded in combat.

He served in the Armée du Rhin 1794-95 and entered the General Staff as an adjutant general to Solignac in the Armée d'Italie in February 1796. In 1797 he was promoted to capitaine d’Etat-major to the army in Italy and in October the following year became first aide de camp to André Masséna in the Armée d'Helvétie. He took part in the campaign in the Helvetic Republic and was promoted to Chef d'Escadron in the field at the First Battle of Zurich in 1799. He was seriously wounded twice by musket balls at the Siege of Genoa (1800).

Masséna, recognising the young man's merit, honoured him with a particular friendship and charged him once he was recovered with the formal presentation of the Italian enemy flags captured at the Battle of Marengo on 14 June 1800 to the new First Consul of France (Napoleon Bonaparte, following a coup the previous year). The General raised him to the rank of adjutant-general, a promotion confirmed on 14 July 1800, when the presentation took place at a public display on the Champ de Mars in Paris: an address was made by Lannes and Burthe also made a speech.

He joined the Armée de Batavie in October and served in Holland and Hanover from 1801. He was named Chief of Staff of the troops in Holland commanded by General Victor, and followed him with the same rank in the Louisiana Expedition.

=== Burthe in Louisiana ===
Burthe accompanied the Prefect Pierre Clément de Laussat (1756–1835) to New Orleans in 1803. Laussat was a diplomat and administrator sent by Napoleon Bonaparte to New Orleans to oversee the transfer of Louisiana (which had been Spanish since the 1760s) from Spain to France (and, as it turned out, the subsequent sale to the United States). The papers of the Laussat collection relate to the retrocession of Louisiana from Spain to France by the Third Treaty of San Ildefonso and the transfer of the territory to the United States under the Louisiana Purchase. Before Laussat left France, he had started to gather data and pertinent information on the colony of Louisiana, and these materials, together with his correspondence, formed the core of his official file which he later brought back with him to France. Laussat gathered documents generated by the Spanish colonial administration, which included royal decrees and implementing orders, regulations on local government, and official reports. His collected papers also include a Decree ordering the arrest of Adjutant Commandant André Burthe, and an Order of Manuel María de Salcedo and the Marqués de Casa Calvo, commissioners of Spain, New Orleans, to Adjutant Commandant André Burthe, New Orleans.

In his memoirs, Laussat records his version of the history of the very public animosity between him and Burthe, which appears to have begun even before the party left France. General Victor commissioned Burthe to accompany Laussat, a civilian travelling with his wife and daughters, in an advance party to arrive ahead of the troops of the main Louisiana expedition. It appears that Burthe's view was that as a member of the military, he should take command of the personnel of the troops while leaving Laussat charge of the supplies and equipment, an idea which Laussat opposed vehemently, seeing himself as in charge of the entire expedition. Laussat initially succeeded in having Burthe dropped from the expedition, but he was reinstated through the intervention of General Victor and joined the company's ship at Rochefort. According to Laussat, Burthe had neither passport nor formal permission to board the ship, and depended on the offices of Laussat himself to ensure he was able to travel. Laussat describes Burthe as having a character marked by conceit and irascibility; although he was not lacking in intelligence, his mind was disorderly and full of revolutionary ideas involving military despotism. However, as Laussat himself was a difficult character who was not well liked by many of his peers, his opinions should be viewed with a degree of objectivity.

Laussat reports that Burthe avoided accompanying him in any formal contact with Admiral Martin, the naval prefect at Rochefort, or with the Spanish commander. It does seem, however, that Burthe made his own separate visits to both, presenting letters from General Victor, and giving the impression that he had secret orders of his own which he did not share with the Prefect.

Meanwhile, New Orleans was surprised by the receipt of the momentous news that Louisiana was to be transferred from Spain to French rule. Preparations were made to quarter the large party of French officers who were expected to arrive in the colony, but on 21 March 1803 local officials saw the arrival of a single ship, the French corvette Surveillant, with on board just Laussat, his family, a small suite of officers and civilian associates, and of course adjutant-general Burthe, who was expected to attach himself to General Victor's staff when that commander should eventually arrive.

Laussat bore a commission as Colonial Prefect. In the government to be established in Louisiana this official was to have powers similar to, but more extensive than, those previously enjoyed by the ruling Spanish Intendant. The remaining officials were to be a Captain-General whose functions paralleled those of the Spanish Governor-General, and a Commissary of Justice set up to superintend the administration of justice and compile a civil and criminal code. In the end, Laussat was the only one of these officials to arrive: Victor, who was appointed Captain-General and Commissioner to receive the Province from the Spanish on the behalf of France, never reached Louisiana.

As early as April 1803, Laussat reported to his government that he was beginning to find his position difficult. It does appear that, as a result of his own personality as much as the force of circumstances, he managed to alienate all parties, even the most rabid Republicans. The Royalists and émigrés saw in him merely the agent of a hated government. His relations with the official classes also gradually grew unpleasant. Laussat attributed this to the influence of the Marquès de Casa Calvo, who arrived in May as the Spanish Commissioner for the transfer of the Province. The power struggle between Burthe and Laussat begun on the voyage from France escalated, representing the rivalry between military and civilian authority. Each refused to recognise the jurisdiction of the other, and the Spanish Governor Salcedo openly received Burthe as if he were a representative of the French government, and allowing him to inspect barracks and hospitals, an action guaranteed to alienate Laussat still further. The animosity between the two Frenchmen became increasingly public, with both parties indulging in disgraceful behaviour, including deliberately organising rival dinner parties and competing for prominent guests. Matters came to a head when both men invited the official Joseph Antoine Vinache to dinner on 14 July 1803; when Vinache only gave conditional acceptance of Burthe's invitation, Laussat claims that Burthe attempted to place Vinache under arrest. Vinache complained of this to Laussat, with the result that Laussat informed Casa Calvo that he was issuing a warrant demanding Burthe's arrest and return to France. (This warrant survives in the collection of Laussat's published papers.) However the Spaniard would not recognize Laussat's rights to make such a demand: he took the ground that, until the Province was actually transferred to France, Spanish authority prevailed.

After this, Laussat publicly snubbed Burthe and flounced out of a formal dinner given by Casa Calvo on 14 October 1803 on discovering that Burthe was also present, announcing that it was not possible for the two of them to be in the same room. The following week, Laussat claims that he refused to pay the officer's salary, telling him to refer the matter back directly to the First Consul. Fortunately for Burthe, by this time he had met the 15-year-old heiress Marguerite-Suzanne Delord-Sarpy (1788–1863), daughter of a wealthy widow and prominent family of the town. (She was granddaughter of Pierre Antoine Foucher de Circé and older sister of Louise Delord Sarpy, who married André's younger cousin Dominique François Burthe, who had also travelled to Louisiana as part of the advance party.)

The couple were married on 23 July 1803 by the hospital chaplain under a special dispensation.

In the event, Louisiana was French for just three weeks (30 November–20 December 1803) as the area became an American territory on 20 December. When they had set out from France to reclaim Louisiana, the Frenchmen had had no way of knowing that Napoleon would sell Louisiana to the United States in April and that France would govern the province for just that three-week interregnum.

André and Suzanne left the colony soon after these events, having secretly booked passage for New York on the American ship Pastley, which they joined on 18 January 1804, and thence sailed to France. Burthe's parting shot was to leave a pamphlet Burthe contre Laussat (publication date 1 January 1804), written in French, which bore the epigraph from Juvenal ‘Facit indignatio versum’ [Indignation makes the verse] and set out Burthe's interpretation of Laussat's conduct. In response, on 11 April 1804 Laussat's supporter Jean-Paul Blanque published a reply (in French), En opposition à Burthe contre Laussat.

=== Subsequent military career ===
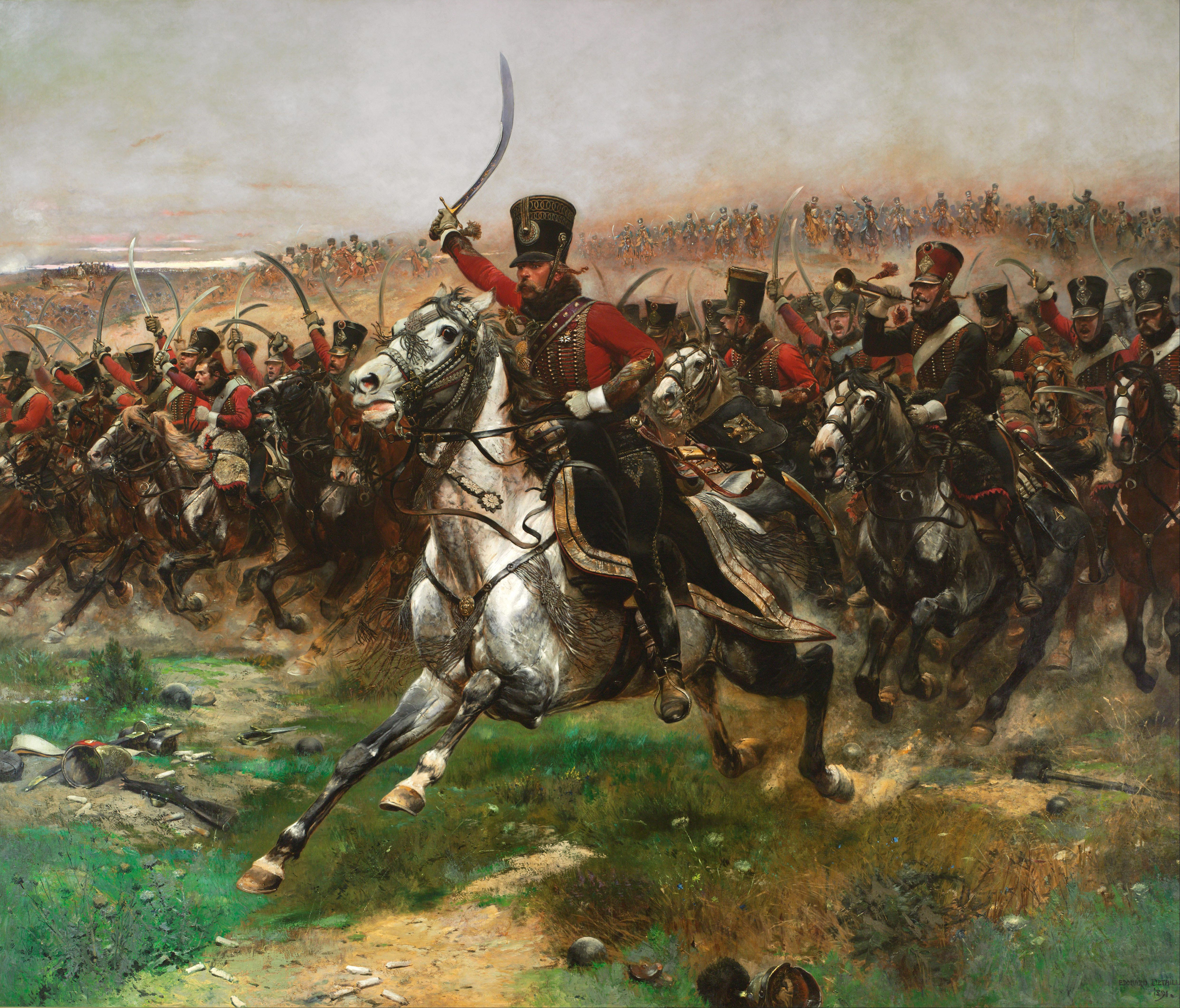
4th Hussar at the Battle of Friedland, 14 June 1807. "Vive l'Empereur!" by Édouard Detaille, 1891.

Burthe returned to Paris with his new wife to pursue his military career. He was promoted to Colonel of 4th Regiment of Hussars on 1 February 1805 and Suzanne, contrary to the reputation of Creole women for being modest and domestic, gaining notoriety by donning military uniform and accompanying her husband on his campaigns.

In December 1805 Burthe led his regiment at the Battle of Austerlitz as part of the Light Cavalry Division under Kellerman. Suzanne followed him to the battlefield and was reputed to be by the side of the Emperor when night fell. In December 1806 Burthe was made Commandeur de la Légion d’Honneur in recognition of his valour. He took part in the campaigns in Prussia and Poland: despite having been wounded at Liebstadt in January, he fought at the Battle of Friedland on 14 June 1807, leading three squadrons of the 4th Hussars. He followed the Brigade to Spain in September 1808 and was made 1e Baron d’Annelet et de l’Empire on 5 October.

Burthe continued to distinguish himself at the Siege of Zaragoza (1809). When Burthe was appointed Général de Cavalerie, his wife became a member of his staff and was known as ‘Monsieur d’Annelet’. She had remained with her husband through his posting to Spain until he arrived at Bayonne, at which point she saw the wisdom of returning to Paris to become a glittering member of society and take care of her growing family. Meanwhile, André took part in the campaign in Aragon at the Siege of Lérida (1810) and was further promoted to Général de Brigade on 30 December 1810.

In December 1811 Burthe was made head of the 8th Brigade of the Second Division of Light Cavalry (Wathier St Alphonse), and served with the Division during the campaign of 1812. He was injured in Moscow in September and taken prisoner by the Russians in November, and was not released until July 1814. He took up arms again in 1815 during the Hundred Days, and led the 1st Brigade of the 9th Cavalry Division at the Battle of Waterloo, fighting against the English. On the Bourbon Restoration Burthe retired from military service; on 6 January 1825 he was granted a pension of 4,000 francs.

=== Civilian life and retirement ===
In 1812 the couple purchased the domaine de la Roche-du-Parc in Noisy-le-Grand (now the site of the Hôtel de Ville of Noisy-le-Grand: the original farm was demolished in 1864 and replaced by the chateau which survives today) as well as part of the nearby Bois Saint-Martin. Four of their ten children were born in the new family home. André and Suzanne became involved in the local community: the baron was named municipal councillor by the Prefecture from 1817 to 1819, and his wife was awarded the title of 'la Mère des pauvres' by the Conseil municipal. The Burthes sold the property in Noisy-le-Grand to the Buissons, a Creole family, in 1827 and appear to have lived out their final years in the city of Paris.

André Burthe d’Annelet died on 2 April 1830 at the Rue St Lazare in Paris, leaving his wife and 8 surviving children. He is buried at the Père-Lachaise cemetery in Paris (28th division Square of Maréchaux). His wife died in 1863 and is buried next to him: her tomb inscription records that she was awarded the Médaille de Sainte-Hélène, participated in the campaigns of 1805-1808 and accompanied her husband to Iéna and Auerstedt. Also buried there are Jules Félix Burthe (1804–1837), officier de cavalerie, Octavie Burthe (1825–1839) and André Adolphe Burthe (1808–1846), capitaine de cavalerie.

Burthe's name appears on the 8th column of the north pillar of the Arc de Triomphe.

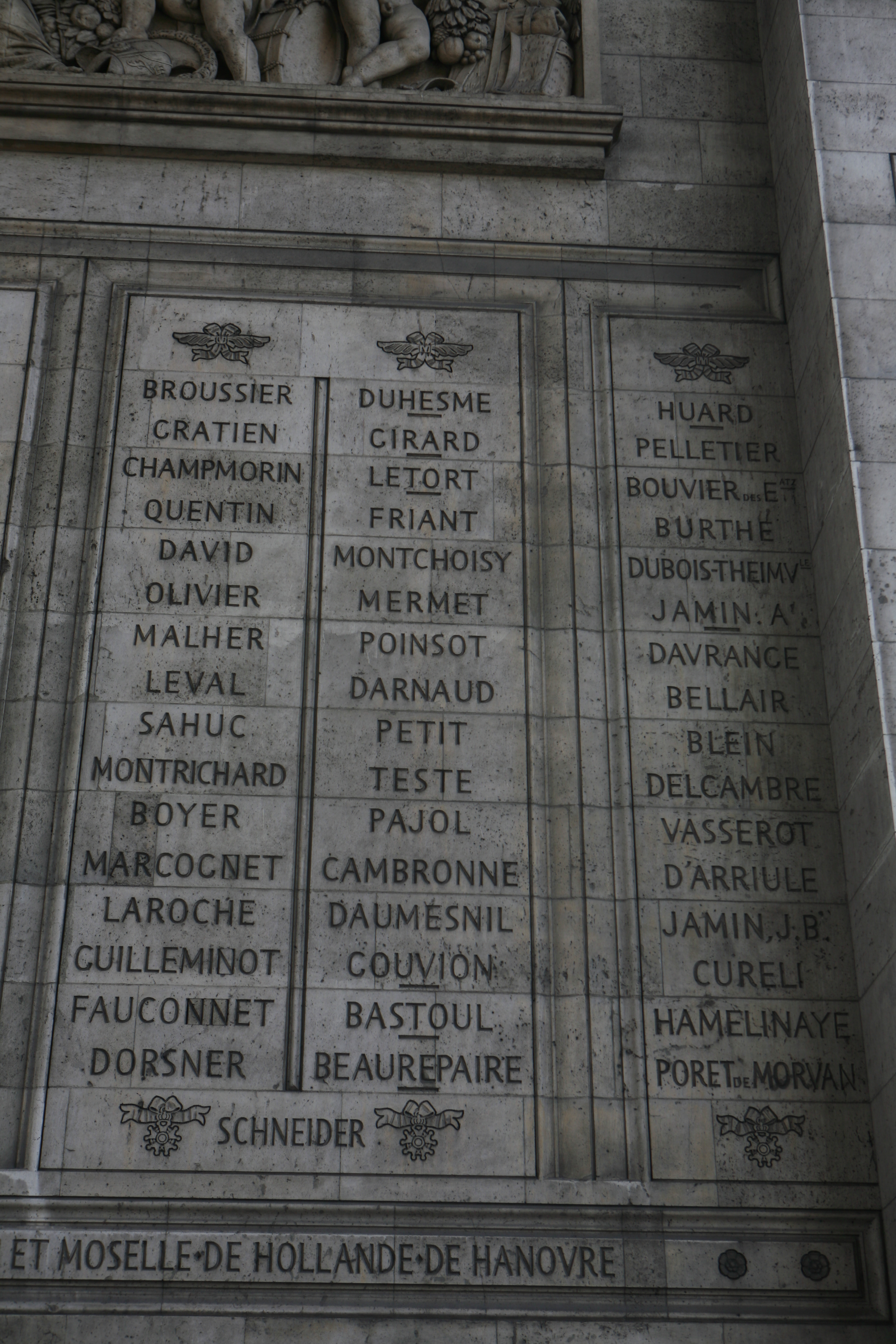
Burthe's name on the Arc de Triomphe in Paris.

His bust is also exhibited at the Musée de l'Armée aux Invalides. The title Baron Burthe d'Annelet was inherited by his son Jules-Félix (1804–1857), who died childless, and subsequently by André's fifth son Charles-François. The family continued to maintain residences at the Rue d'Aumale in Paris and Rosenthal until the 1930s.
