= Kate Beath =

New Zealand architect (1882–1979)

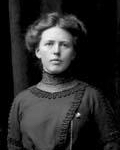
- Born: Katherine Christian Beath; 20 December 1882; Christchurch, New Zealand
- Died: 29 June 1979 (aged 96)
- Occupation: Architect

Katherine Christian Beath (married name McDougall; 20 December 1882 – 29 June 1979) was probably the first female professional architect in New Zealand.

== Biography ==
Beath was born in Christchurch in 1882, the daughter of Marie Malcolm (eldest sister of Kate Sheppard) and George Low Beath, founder of the Christchurch department store Beath and Co. Her family were artistic and musical and members of the Congregational Church, YMCA and YWCA. Beath was the niece of the feminist Kate Sheppard.

Beath studied at the Canterbury School of Art in Christchurch from 1899 to 1904, after completing her studies, she trained as an architect under Samuel Hurst Seager until 1908. During this time she took courses and sat the South Kensington Art and Science examinations in design, model drawing and building construction. She then travelled to London with her aunt Kate Sheppard where she studied architecture across the United Kingdom and Europe. Beath arrived back to Christchurch in 1910.

Throughout her career she lectured in both architecture and decorative design at the Canterbury School of Art.

In 1915, she married Colin Barclay McDougall (1889–1982), a pharmacist from Christchurch. The couple moved to Wellington, had children and lived in a house in Island Bay for over 40 years.

Beath was also a prolific watercolour painter and part of The Canterbury Arts and Crafts Movement, with works in the collection of Kate Sheppard House and artists files at Museum of New Zealand Te Papa Tongarewa.

Beath was honoured with a panel in the Suffrage in Stitches expedition created and toured by the Wellington Museum.
