= Karl Beth =

German psychologist (1872–1959)

Karl Beth (1872–1959) was a German academic involved in the fields of the history of religion, the psychology of religion, and Christianity. He has been described as "one of the founding fathers of the psychology of religion".

== Career ==
Adolf von Harnack, Otto Pfleiderer, and Wilhelm Dilthey supervised Beth's studies at the University of Berlin, where he earned a doctorate in 1898 for his dissertation Die Grundanschauungen Schleiermachers in seinem ersten Entwurf der philosophischen Sittenlehre. Beth became an instructor of systematic theology at the university in 1901. Shortly afterwards, he toured Christian communities in the Greek and Turkish parts of the Mediterranean, where he gathered material for his book Die orientalische Christenheit der Mittelmeerlander. Published in 1902, this book helped Western Protestants gain a better understanding of Eastern Orthodoxy.

In 1906, Beth moved to the Protestant Theological Faculty at the University of Vienna, and in the same year married Marianne Weisl. He was promoted to a full professorship in Vienna in 1908. He taught systematic theology and, partly influenced by Johannes Reinke and Carl Nägeli proposed a Neo-vitalist view. He partly accepted the idea of evolution as biological change, but at the same time, he criticized the idea of a driving process of natural selection for it suggested chance instead of "direct divine intervention." Recalling the limitis of science, Beth insisted that religious experience should not be interpreted out of context, and that science and religion should co-exist together.

In 1922, Beth was one of the parties involved in the foundation of the Research Institute for the Psychology of Religion in Vienna. He also served as the editor of Zeitschrift fur Religionspsychologie from 1927 to 1938. He wrote the main article on "Orthodox-anatolische Kirche" and several related articles for the second edition of Religion in Geschichte und Gegenwart, published between 1929 and 1932.

By 1938, Beth was the Dean of Faculty at the University of Vienna. After the 1938 Anschluss in which Germany annexed Austria, Beth's wife Marianne (a lawyer from a Jewish family who had converted to Christianity on marrying) was unable to continue practicing law. The Beths emigrated to the United States; Karl Beth was on the faculty of the Meadville Lombard Theological School from 1941 to 1944, where he primarily taught in the field of the history of religions.

== Works ==
- Die orientalische Christenheit der Mittelmeerländer, 1902.
- Das Wesen der Christentums und die moderne historische Denkweise, 1904.
- Die Wunder Jesu, 1905.
- Die Moderne und die Prizipien der Theologie, 1907.
- Das Wunder, 1908.
- Der Entwicklungsgedanke und das Christentum, 1909.
- Urmensch, Welt und Gott, 1909.
- Hat Jesus gelebt?, 1910.
- Die Entwicklung des Christentums zur Universal-Religion, 1910.
- Religion und Magie bei den Naturvölkern, 1914.
- Die Urreligion, 1917.
- Gesunddenken und Gesundbeten, 1918.
- Einführung in die vergleichende Religionsgeschichte, 1920.
- Religionspsychologie, 1926.
- Frömmigkeit der Mystik und des Glaubens, 1927.
- Die Krisis des Protestantismus, 1932.
