= Dominique François Victor Burthe =

American politician and planter (1811–1868)

Member of the Louisiana Senate from the Jefferson Parish district

Personal details
- Born: January 10, 1811 New Orleans, Louisiana, U.S.A.
- Died: May 20, 1868 (aged 57) New York City, New York, USA
- Resting place: Saint Louis Cemetery #1
- Spouse: Antoinette Estelle Millaudon

Dominique François "Victor" Burthe (1811–1868), was born in Jefferson, Louisiana, to Dominique François Burthe, a native of Metz, France, and Louise Delord-Sarpy (1789–1848), whose father Sylvester Delord-Sarpy's plantation became Tivoli Circle. His father had purchased the plantation that became known as Burtheville from Bernard de Marigny by an act passed before Felix de Armas, Notary Public, on 3 June 1831 at the price of $38,000. He married Antoinette Estelle Millaudon, daughter of Benjamin Laurent Millaudon. He was a judge in Jefferson Parish and later served as a Senator in the Louisiana State Senate from Jefferson Parish. As a judge he ruled on the Joseph Tom v. The Slave Ernest at the Carrollton Courthouse. He was president of The Boston Club from 1866 to 1868.
