= Bustard Green =

Hamlet in Essex, England

Coordinates: 51.9321°N 0.3939°E

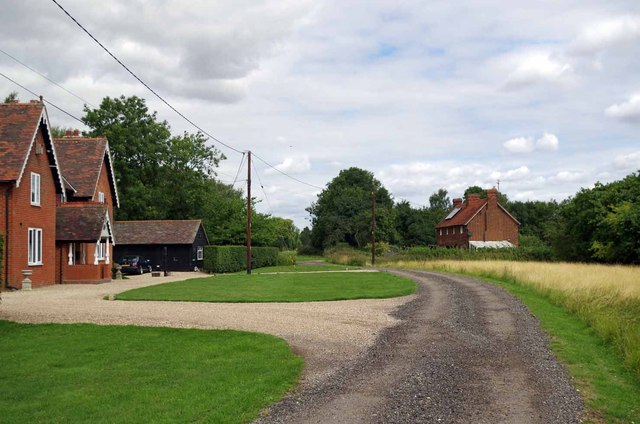

- Location within Essex
- Civil parish: Lindsell
- District: Uttlesford
- Shire county: Essex
- Region: East
- Country: England
- Sovereign state: United Kingdom
- Police: Essex
- Fire: Essex
- Ambulance: East of England

Bustard Green is a hamlet in the civil parish of Lindsell, in the Uttlesford district of Essex, England, and is just under 1 mile (2 km) north from the village of Lindsell.

Bustard Green has a Wild Essex site, which is home to bee orchids and turtle doves.
