= Lindsell =

Village in Essex, England

Coordinates: 51.9180°N 0.3884°E

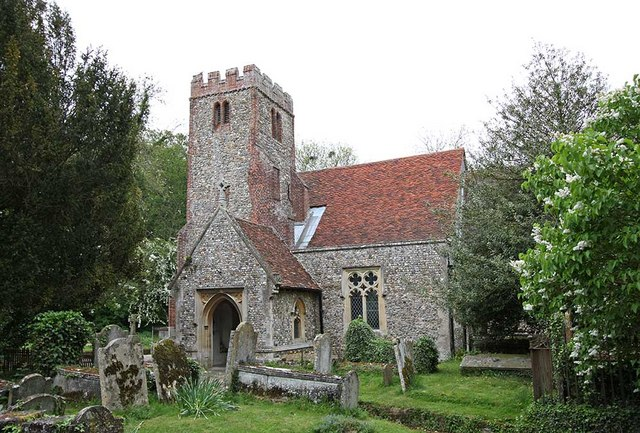
- Church of St Mary the Virgin

- Location within Essex
- Population: 259 (Parish, 2021)
- OS grid reference: TL643270
  - London: 46 mi (74 km)
- Civil parish: Lindsell
- District: Uttlesford
- Shire county: Essex
- Region: East
- Country: England
- Sovereign state: United Kingdom
- Post town: Dunmow
- Postcode district: CM6
- Dialling code: 01371
- Police: Essex
- Fire: Essex
- Ambulance: East of England
- UK Parliament: North West Essex

Lindsell is a village and civil parish in the district of Uttlesford in the county of Essex, England. Nearby settlements include the parish hamlets of Holder's Green and Bustard Green. The parish church is dedicated to St Mary The Virgin. At the 2021 census the parish had a population of 259.

== History ==
Lindsell's length of history as an inhabited place is shown by Roman brick in the foundations of St Mary's church. The settlement's name means "Huts among the lime trees." However, further historical names include "Templars", which was named by John le Templar in 1313, and "Rakefairs", given by Robert Rekeviewer in 1381. The current name of the village had previous spellings such as 'Lyndesele', 'Lindeseles' and 'Lindezel.'

In 1870, Lindsell was described as a village that stands on a small affluent of the river Chelmer, 3½ miles southeast of Thaxted, and 5 miles north-northeast of Dunmow Railway Station.

According to the 2011 Census, Lindsell had a population of 260 people.

Lindsell gives its name to a surname.

== Demography ==
The number of houses in Lindsell has fluctuated since 1831, peaking in 1851 with 77 houses. The largest drop was in the early 1900s, which is probably due to the fall in population from the Boer War, World War I and World War II. The postwar housing boom after 1945 accounts for the sudden increase in houses from 53 in 1931, to 68 in 1951 and 71 in 1961.

According to the 2011 census, Lindsell has a total of 91 households, 69 of them being detached houses, 19 semi-detached, 1 terrace, 1 apartment and 1 flat. 197 people, the biggest proportion, live in detached houses. 52 people live in semi-detached properties, with 1 person living in a terrace, 8 people living in a flat and an apartment, with a final 2 living in a temporary home. This means there is an average of 2.9 people living in each household, which is higher than the UK national average in 2011 of 2.3 persons per household. 69 out of the 91 households use oil for heating, with 11 using gas, 2 using electric, 1 using a type classed as 'other', and 8 using a combination of oil, gas and electric.

There is a significant number of people over retirement age living in Lindsell, there is also a high number of people between the ages of three and twenty one, as well as between 35 and 51 This means that the average age of people living in Lindsell is 45, which is far below the retirement age of 65, suggesting that Lindsell does not follow the trend set by many other rural villages across the UK. Out of 260 people only 17 are officially retired, with 73 being employed full-time, part-time, either working for larger corporations, working within the village itself, or being self-employed.

The population of Lindsell is predominately white, with 249 out of 260 being listed as 'white with English/Welsh/Scottish/Northern Irish heritage'.

The church of St. Mary the Virgin is Anglican. 193 out of 260 residents are listed as Christian. Two people are listed as Buddhist, 55 as 'no religion' and ten did not state.

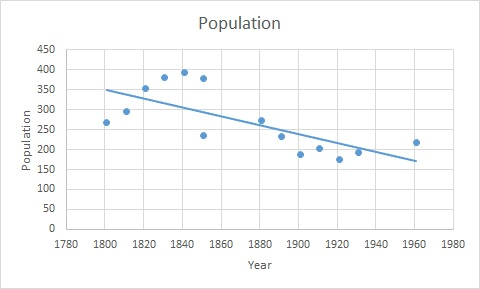
Population 1801 to 1961

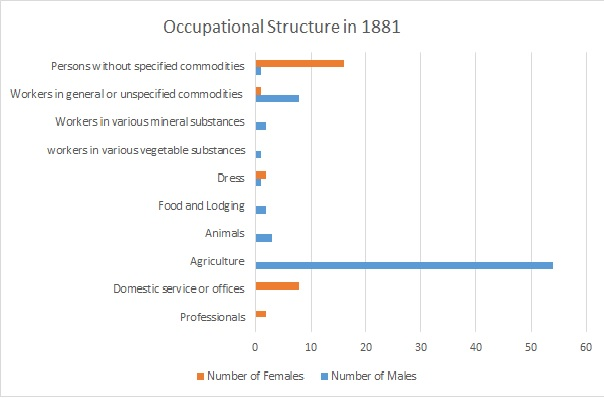
1881 occupational structure

Population age count

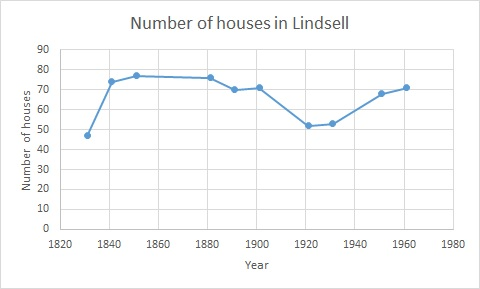
Housing numbers

Religion

== See also ==
- The Hundred Parishes
