= Dominique François Burthe =

French planter in Louisiana (1785–1852)

Dominique François Burthe (1785–1852), was born in Metz, France in 1785, son of the merchant Louis Burthe and Maria Gaudres. He entered military service and travelled to Louisiana in the company of his older cousin André Burthe on the ship taking the Prefect Laussat to arrange the transfer of the colony from Spain to France prior to the Louisiana Purchase. According to Blanque, Dominique François was bearer of a letter from the Ministry of War stating that he was to take up the position of Sous-Lieutenant in the 54th Infantry, one of the regiments to be sent to Louisiana. The letter gave him orders to join his regiment at Batavie, where they were stationed, but the elder Burthe found it more convenient to have his cousin embark on the Surveillent: Blanque suggests that he was never properly appointed to officer status.

While in Louisiana the two Burthes met and married the two daughters of the widow Delord-Sarpy. Dominique François married Louise Delord Sarpy (1789–1848) in St Louis Cathedral on 8 May 1805, over a year after the departure of his uncle to France with his bride Suzanne, Louise's elder sister, who was married at the age of 15. Unlike his kinsman, Dominique François chose to remain in New Orleans as Mr. Burthe and became an important figure in local society.

The couple had five surviving children: Marie Marguerite Félicie (1807–1877) who married Louis Fréderic Foucher de Circé; Léonce André (1809–1868) who married Françoise Henriette Pollock; the judge Dominique François Victor Burthe (1811–1868) who married Antoinette Estelle Millaudon; Joséph Antoine Henry Burthe (1820–1855), who married Joséphine Théodorine (Pauline) Abat; and the painter Léopold Burthe (1823–1860).

Dominique François acquired a plantation fronting on the river from Bernard Marigny by an act passed before Felix de Armas, Notary Public, on 3 June 1831 at the price of $38,000. On 24 January 1854, two years after Dominique François died, a plan was made by Numegger, Surveyor to subdivide the property: this subdivision was called 'Burtheville' and is now one of the faubourgs of modern New Orleans.

He was a prominent Freemason and made a life member of the Grand Lodge of the State of Louisiana after being admitted in 1822. He was also one of the founders of Jefferson College in Convent, Louisiana in 1831 (the original building was destroyed by fire in 1842) and President of the New Orleans and Carrollton Railroad Company, responsible for the oldest line of street cars in the city, in 1834.

Dominique François died in New Orleans on 12 December 1852, aged 69.
