= McBeth =

McBeth (also MacBeth, MacBeath) is a Scottish surname. Notable people with the surname include:

- Archibald Alexander McBeth Duncan (1926–2017), British historian
- Andy McBeth (born 1943), Scottish footballer
- George MacBeth (1932-1992), Scottish poet and novelist
- John McBeth (1944–2023), author and journalist from New Zealand
- Jono McBeth (born 1973), New Zealand former professional yachtsman
- Marcus McBeth (born 1980), American baseball player
- Nathan McBeth (born 1998), South African rugby union player
- Paul McBeth (born 1990), American professional disc golfer
- W. Francis McBeth (1933–2012), American composer

== See also ==
- Macbeth, King of Scotland, Mac Bethad mac Findlaích, rí na h-Alba. His death following the Battle of Lumphanan paved the way for feudalism to replace the traditional Celtic legal and political system of Scotland.
- Misspelling of: The Tragedy of Macbeth (commonly called Macbeth) is a play by William Shakespeare about a regicide and its aftermath
- Boys Own McBeth, musical comedy by Grahame Bond and Jim Burnett
- Sue McBeth Cabin on U.S. Route 12 in Idaho County
