= Henry Macbeth-Raeburn =

Scottish painter and printmaker

Henry Macbeth-Raeburn RA
- Born: Henry Raeburn Macbeth; 24 September 1860
- Died: 3 December 1947 (aged 87); Great Yarmouth, Norfolk
- Known for: Printmaking
- Spouses: Isabelle Elizabeth McOscar (m. 1884; died 1929); Marjorie May Bacon (m. 1936)
- Children: Rita Macbeth-Raeburn (1887–1960)
- Awards: Royal Academician

Henry Macbeth-Raeburn RA (born Henry Raeburn Macbeth; 24 September 1860 – 3 December 1947) was a Scottish painter and printmaker. His father was the portrait painter Norman Macbeth and his niece Ann Macbeth. His elder brothers James Macbeth (1847–1891) and Robert Walker Macbeth, RA (1848–1910) were also artists.

== Life ==
He was named after the Scottish portraitist Henry Raeburn, and in later life he changed his surname in devotion to the celebrated portraitist. It was also an advantage to distinguish himself from the many members of his artistic family. Macbeth-Raeburn exhibited at the Royal Academy in London from 1881 onwards, and was elected ARA in 1922 and full member in 1933. His diploma work, from 1933, was a mezzotint after Raeburn's 1793 portrait of Dr. Nathaniel Spens.

He married Isabelle Elizabeth McOscar (1862–1929) on 24 April 1884, and they had one daughter, Rita Macbeth-Raeburn, who was depicted in a portrait by her uncle Robert Walker Macbeth shown at the Royal Academy in 1905. Isabelle died in 1929, and in 1936 Macbeth-Raeburn married secondly the artist Marjorie May Bacon, who at the time was aged 34. Shortly afterwards the couple moved to Great Yarmouth. Macbeth-Raeburn died on 3 December 1947 in Great Yarmouth, the bride's home town.
