= Norman Macbeth =

Scottish portraitist

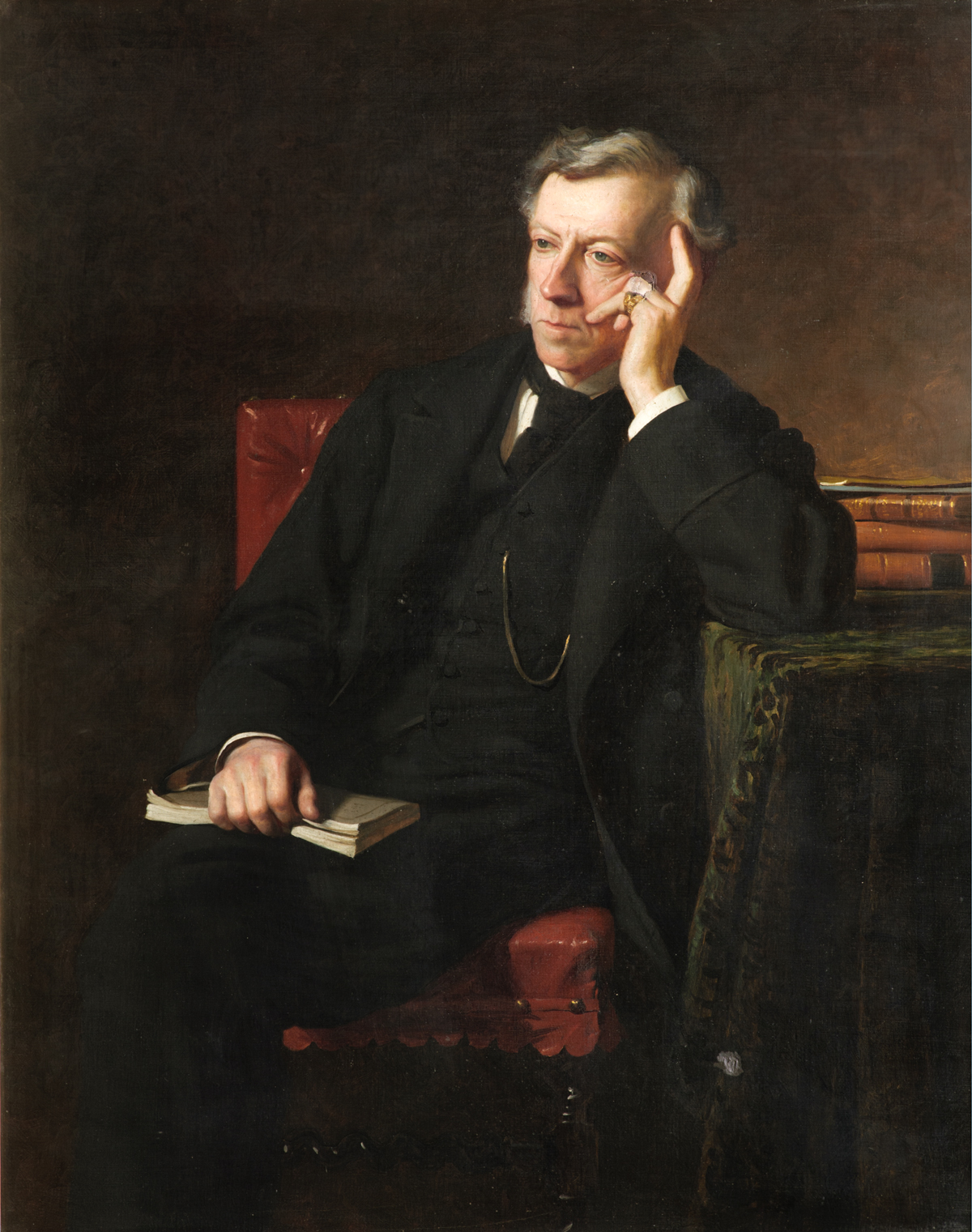
William Ferguson of Kinmundy, portrait by Norman Macbeth

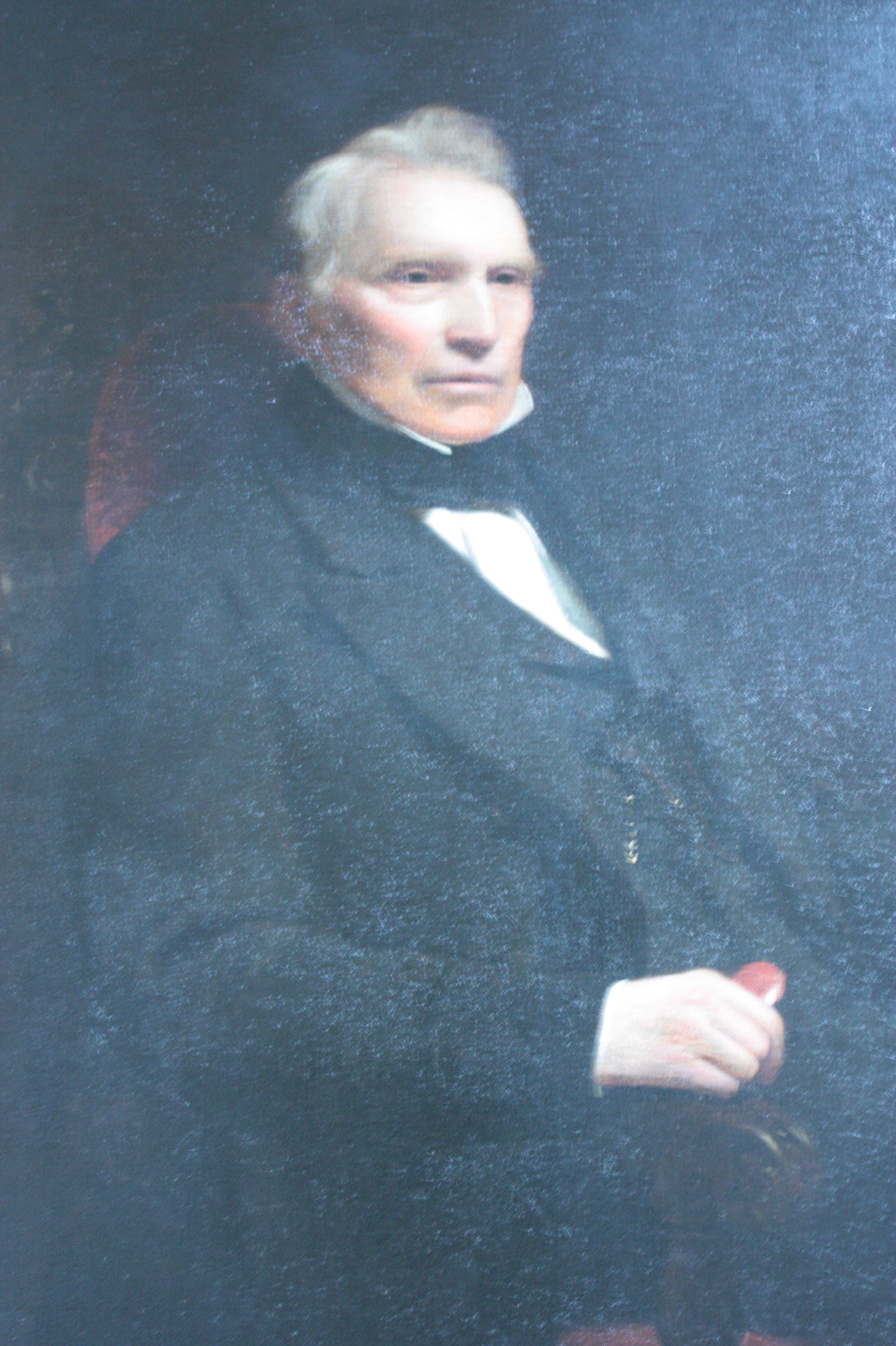
James Blackadder, Master of the Merchant Company, Edinburgh, by Norman Macbeth

Norman Macbeth RSA (1821 in Greenock – 27 February 1888 in London) was a Scottish portraitist.

== Life ==
He was born at Greenock, where his father James Macbeth was an excise official. He served a seven years' apprenticeship as an engraver in Glasgow, and then went to London, where he studied at the Royal Academy Schools, and copied artworks in the National Gallery. He moved on to Paris, where he worked in the Louvre and studied under a master.

In 1845 Macbeth established himself as a portrait-painter in Greenock, moving to Glasgow in 1848, and in 1856 again practising in Greenock. Since 1845 he had been a regular contributor to the exhibitions of the Royal Scottish Academy, and in 1861 he went to Edinburgh. There he was successful as a portrait-painter, and was elected an Associate Royal Scottish Academician (ARSA) in 1870, and full member in 1880, entitling him to add the letters 'RSA' after his name.

About two years before his death Macbeth moved to London. There he represented the Royal Scottish Academy as trustee of the British Institution Scholarship Fund. He died there on 27 February 1888.

== Works ==
Macbeth's portraits were considered unmistakable likenesses. His works include the portraits of Sir John Steell RSA, acquired by the Royal Scottish Academy, and that of the Rev. Dr. Lindsay Alexander, by the Scottish National Portrait Gallery.

His portrait of Patrick Don Swan of Springfield is held in Kirkcaldy.

== Family ==
Macbeth married Mary Walker, and they had six sons. Three of those James Macbeth (1847–1891), Robert Walker Macbeth RA (1848–1910), and Henry Macbeth-Raeburn RA (1860–1947) also became artists, and Allan Macbeth a musician. One other son named after him, Norman Macbeth, had a daughter Ann Macbeth who was prominent in the Glasgow Movement. Mary Walker Macbeth, a daughter, married Arthur Thomson.
