= Adam K. Bert =

American stamp collector and dealer (1905–2007)

- Born: January 13, 1905
- Died: February 22, 2007 (aged 102); Pittsburgh, Pennsylvania
- Education: Washington & Jefferson College
- Occupations: Pittsburgh stamp dealer; customers included FDR
- Organization(s): American Philatelic Society; Society of Philatelic Americans
- Known for: American First Day Cover Society's Silver Tray award
- Spouse: Eleda
- Children: Paul

Adam K. Bert (1905–2007), of Beaver Falls, Pennsylvania, was a stamp collector and dealer, who operated his stamp business in Pittsburgh.

== Collecting interests ==
For his own collections, Bert was interested in collecting “socked on the nose” cancellations on postage stamps, as well as first day covers of stamps of the United States.

== Philatelic activity ==
Bert started collecting stamps as a teenager, and then sold them to classmates in school and to his teachers. By the time he was 18, he established his first day cover business.

Bert “serviced” first day covers by having the appropriate post office cancel his special first day covers with the appropriate cancellation, and then returning the cancelled covers to his customers.

One of Bert's customers was fellow stamp collector Franklin Delano Roosevelt, who was governor of New York at the time.

== Honors and awards ==
Bert received the Silver Tray award of the American First Day Cover Society for numerous articles he wrote on fraudulent first day covers.

== Legacy ==
Bert was over 100 years old when he died and had the distinction of having the longest tenure of membership at the American Philatelic Society. He also had the distinction, when he closed his downtown Pittsburgh store in 1996, of operating the nation's oldest first-day cover service.

== See also ==
- Philately
- Philatelic literature
