= William Frederick Yeames =

British painter (1835–1918)

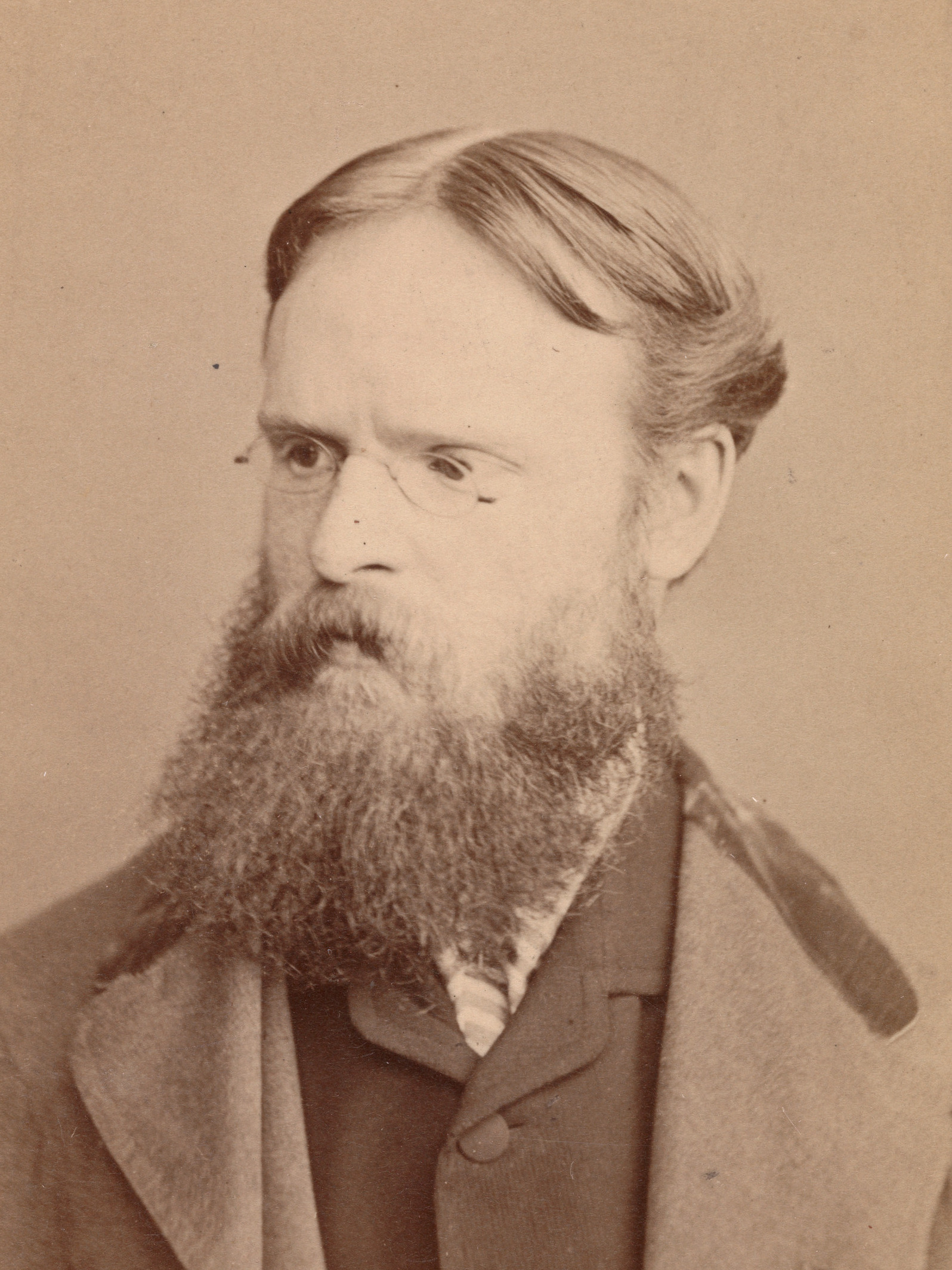
- Portrait by John Watkins, 1860s
- Born: 18 December 1835; Taganrog, Russian Empire
- Died: 3 May 1918 (aged 82); Teignmouth, Devon, England
- Known for: Painting
- Notable work: Amy Robsart (1877); And When Did You Last See Your Father? (1878)

William Frederick Yeames RA (/jiːmz/; 18 December 1835 – 3 May 1918) was a British painter of genre and narrative subjects, often drawn from history. He is probably still best known for his oil-on-canvas "And When Did You Last See Your Father?", which depicts the son of a Royalist being questioned by Parliamentarians during the English Civil War.

== Biography ==
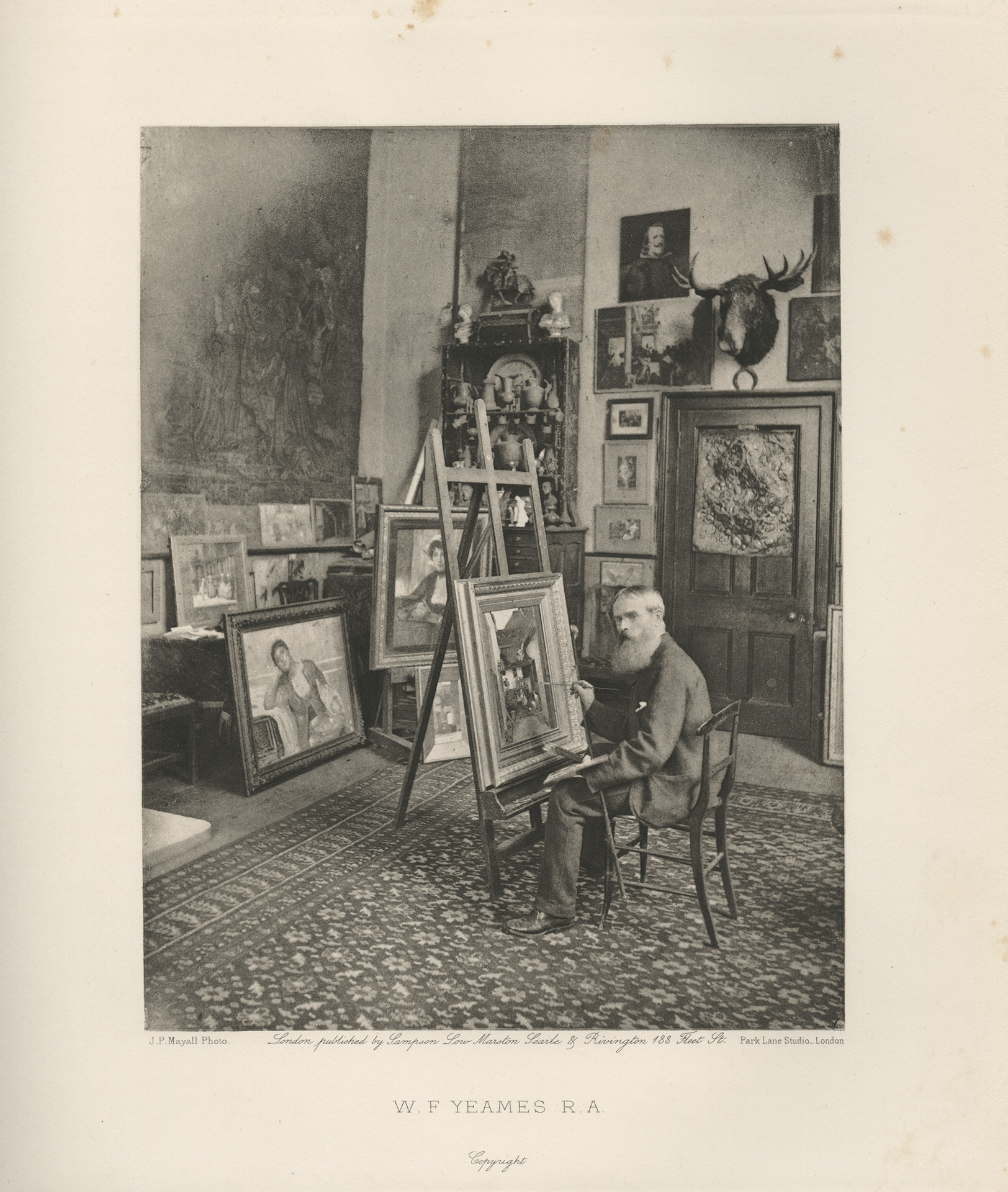
Yeames by J. P. Mayall from Artists at Home photogravure

Yeames was born in the port city of Taganrog on the Sea of Azov in the Russian Empire, the son of a British consul in Russia. After the death of his father in 1842, Yeames was sent to school in Dresden where he began studying painting.

After a change in the fortunes of his family, Yeames moved to London in 1848, where he learnt anatomy and composition from George Scharf and took art lessons from F. A. Westmacott. In 1852 he journeyed to Florence where he studied with Enrico Pollastrini and Raphael Buonajuti. During his time there he painted at the Life School at the Grand Ducal Academy, drawing from frescoes by Andrea del Sarto, Ghirlandaio and Gozzoli. Continuing on to Rome, he painted landscape studies and copied Old Masters, including the frescoes of Raphael in the Vatican.

Returning to London in 1859, Yeames set up a studio in Park Place and, with Philip Hermogenes Calderon, Frederick Goodall, and George Adolphus Storey, formed the loose association of artists known as the St John's Wood Clique. The group concentrated on subjects of a historical nature and narrative paintings in which the story was revealed by close study of the actions and expressions of the subjects. In Yeames's work, this technique evolved into the genre known as the problem picture, in which the narrative of the image creates an unresolved dilemma or paradox for the viewer.

In 1905, he painted a mural for the Royal Exchange, London The Foundation of St Paul's School, 1509.

Yeames married on 18 August 1865 Anne Winfield, daughter of Major James Stainbank Winfield of the East India Company, and sister of the photographer David Wilkie Wynfield.

While their work was popular with the public, the St John's Wood Clique found it difficult to get their work displayed at prestigious galleries and the Royal Academy of Arts, because it never received critical acclaim. Yeames managed to overcome this problem and from 1859 exhibited at the Royal Academy and was made an Associate (ARA) in 1866.

Unlike other artist circles of the time, the St John's Wood Clique did not lead a bohemian lifestyle; Yeames took holidays at Hever Castle and lived comfortably in London. He and Goodall specialized in Tudor and Stuart subjects, but did not always portray the events they depicted with historical accuracy – instead using them as inspiration.

He died in Teignmouth, Devon on 3 May 1918.

In 2000, a blue plaque commemorating Yeames was installed at his former home, 8 Campbell Road, Hanwell, London, where he lived from 1894 until 1912.

== "And When Did You Last See Your Father?" ==
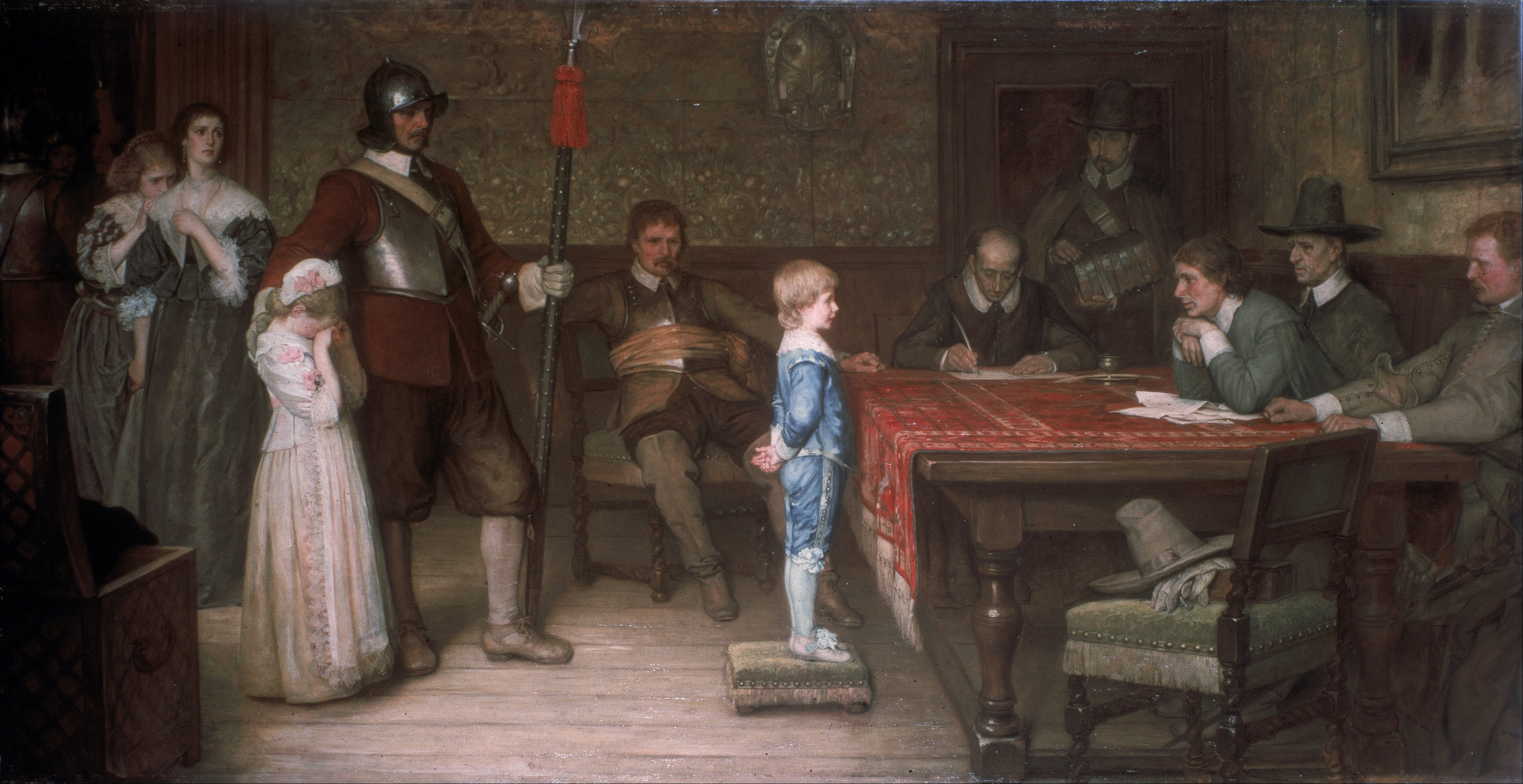
"And When Did You Last See Your Father?" by Yeames (1878), 131 cm (51.57 in) by 251.5 cm (99.01 in)

The oil-on-canvas picture, painted in 1878, depicts a scene in an imaginary Royalist household during the English Civil War. The Parliamentarians have taken over the house and question the son about his Royalist father (the man lounging on a chair in the centre of the scene is identifiable as a Roundhead officer by his military attire and his orange sash).

Yeames was inspired to paint the picture to show the crises that could arise from the natural frankness of young children. Here, if the boy tells the truth he will endanger his father, but if he lies he will go against the ideal of honesty undoubtedly instilled in him by his parents.

The boy in the picture is based on Thomas Gainsborough's painting The Blue Boy. It was modelled by Yeames's nephew, James Lambe Yeames. Behind the boy, there is a girl, probably the daughter, waiting her turn to be questioned. The girl was based on Yeames's niece, Mary Yeames. At the back of the hall at left the mother and elder daughter wait anxiously on the boy's reply.

The scene is neutral: while the innocence of the boy is emphasized by his blond hair, open expression and blue suit, the questioners are also treated sympathetically; the main interrogator has a friendly expression, and the sergeant with the little girl has his arm on her shoulder as if comforting her.

The painting is at the Walker Art Gallery, Liverpool, having been bought in 1878, just a year after the gallery opened in 1877. Madame Tussauds in London formerly displayed a life-size waxwork tableau of the scene – faithfully reproduced from the painting – which was on show from 1933 to 1989.

== Gallery ==
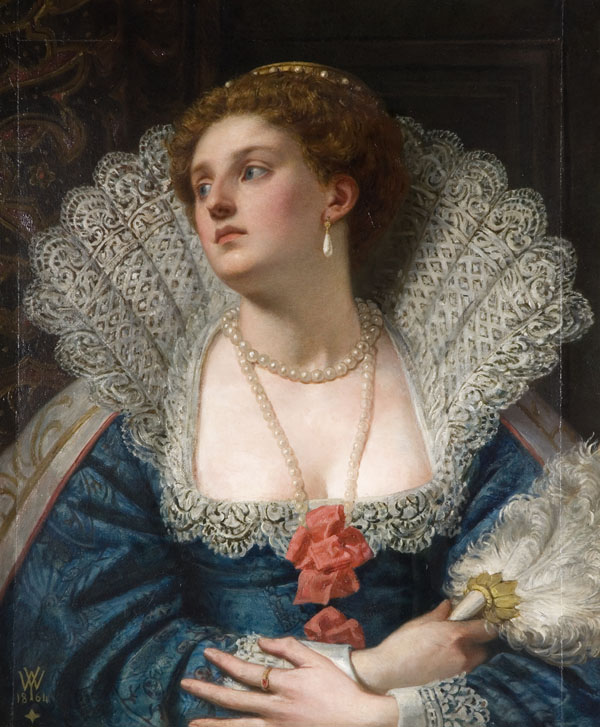
Amy Robsart (1870)

Pour les Pauvres(1875)

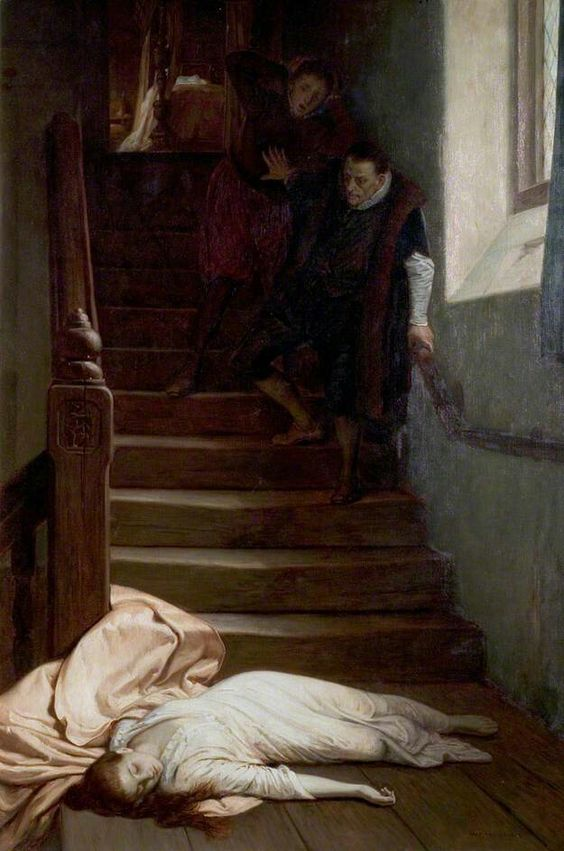
Amy Robsart (1877).
Yeames favoured Tudor and Stuart subjects, and was fascinated by the events surrounding the death of Amy Robsart, the first wife of Robert Dudley, 1st Earl of Leicester
