= Amy Robsart (painting) =

1877 painting by William Frederick Yeames

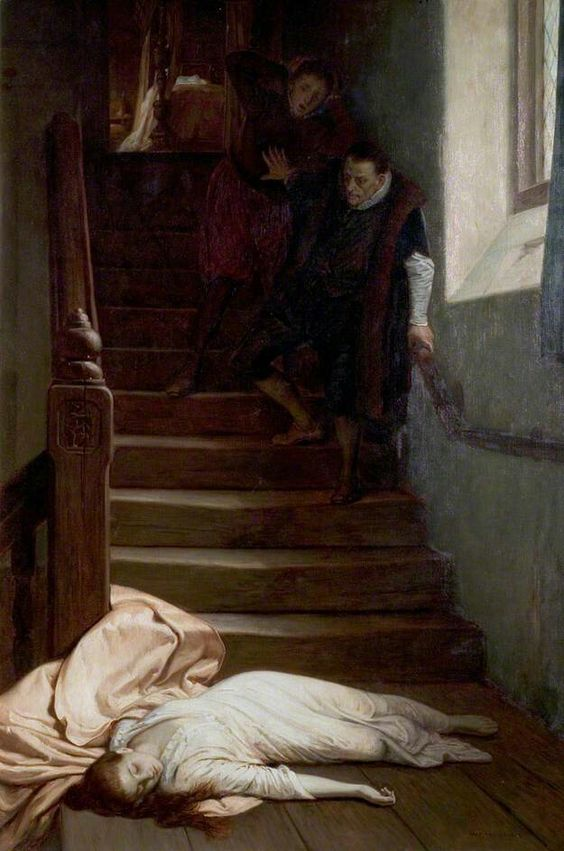
- Artist: William Frederick Yeames
- Year: 1877
- Type: Oil on canvas, history painting
- Dimensions: 281.5 cm × 188.5 cm (110.8 in × 74.2 in)
- Location: Tate Britain, London

Amy Robsart is an 1877 history painting by the British artist William Frederick Yeames. It depicts the mysterious death of Amy Robsart, the neglected wife of the English aristocrat Lord Robert Dudley, future Earl of Leicester, during the Elizabethan era. Leicester was a leading royal favourite of Elizabeth I and the sudden death of his wife at Cumnor Hall in 1560 led to widespread speculation. The incident was well-known to Victorians because of Walter Scott's popular novel Kenilworth, in which the death was portrayed as a murder, which seems to be the version followed here. The figure on the stairs at right had, in Scott's story, killed Robsart with a henchman, and placed her body at the bottom of the stairs, later pretending to have found it. Yeames was part of the St John's Wood Clique, and produced paintings inspired by British history.

The painting was displayed at the Royal Academy Exhibition of 1877 held at Burlington House in London and then again at the Exposition Universelle of 1878 in Paris. It was acquired through the Chantrey Bequest and is now in the collection of the Tate Britain. A slightly smaller (87 x 61 cm) replica version, painted in 1878, of it is in the collection of Nottingham Castle.

== See also ==
- Leicester and Amy Robsart at Cumnor Hall, an 1866 painting by Edward Matthew Ward

== Bibliography ==
- Barlow, Paul. Time Present and Time Past: The Art of John Everett Millais. Routledge, 2017.
- Gould, Charlotte (ed.) Marketing Art in the British Isles, 1700 to the Present: A Cultural History. Routledge, 2017.
