= James Mathews Leigh =

English painter

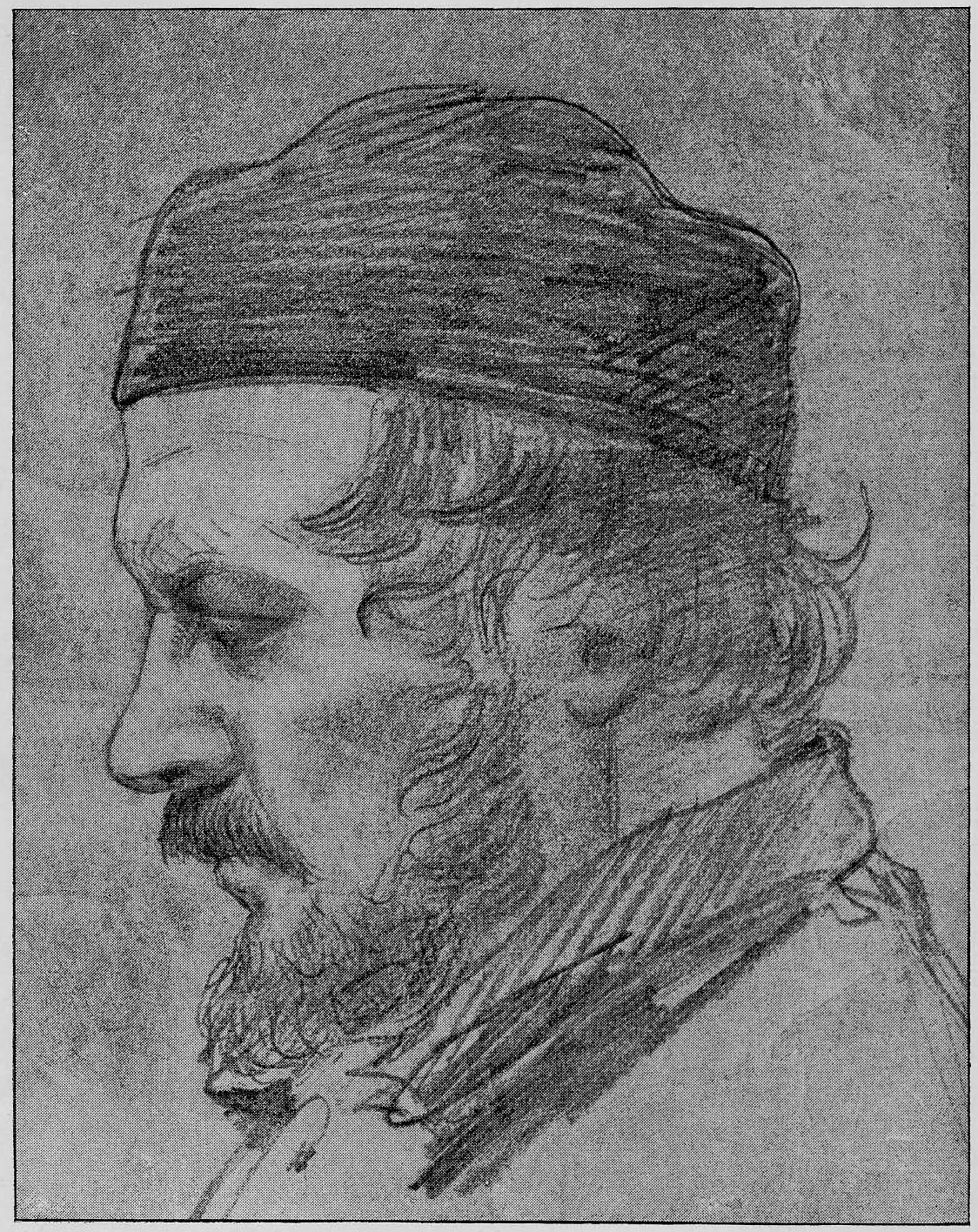
Portrait by Henry Stacy Marks

James Mathews Leigh (1808 – 20 April 1860) was an English art educator, painter, writer, dramatist and critic. He is best known as the founder of a popular private art school in London known as "Leigh's Academy", which eventually became the present day Heatherley School of Fine Art.

== Life and work ==
Leigh was born in London in 1808, the son of Samuel Leigh, a well-known bookseller who ran a shop at 18 The Strand, near the Adelphi Theatre London - William Blake was apparently a frequent visitor. James's uncle was the popular actor and theatre manager Charles Mathews ("the elder"). He studied art under William Etty, deciding to make historical painting his speciality. He first exhibited at the Royal Academy in 1830 with two paintings, Joseph presenting his Brethren to Pharaoh and Jephthah's vow.

Soon afterwards, he went on a tour of the continent, visiting galleries in France, Germany and Italy to study the works of the Old Masters and make sketches. Around this time also he devoted himself to writing, and, in 1838, privately published Cromwell an historical play in five acts, and later The Rhenish Album. He then travelled to Spain where he made further sketches, resuming, on his return to England, work as a painter, and continuing to send paintings of sacred subjects and portraits to the Royal Academy and other exhibitions up to 1849.

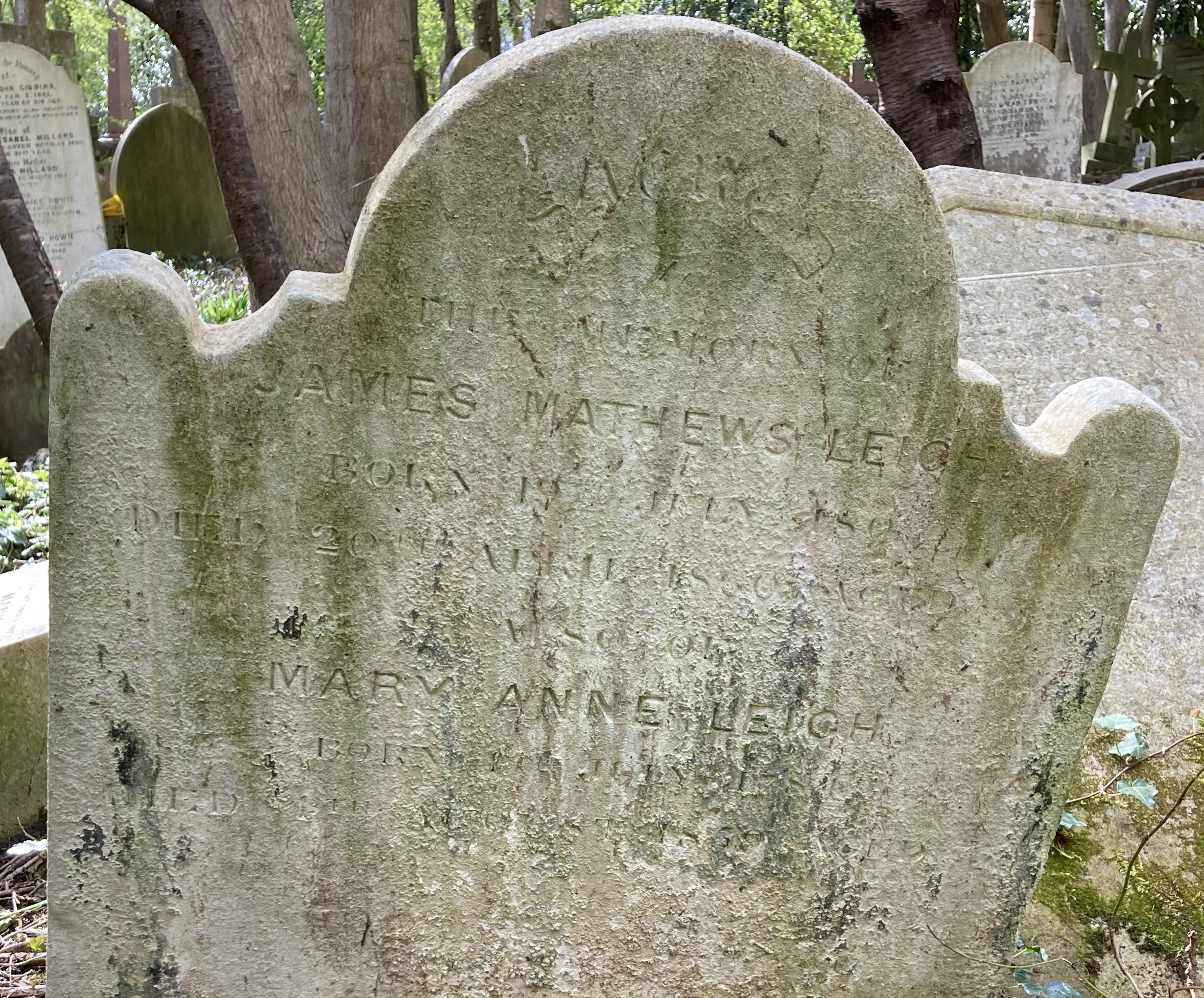
Grave of James Mathews Leigh in Highgate Cemetery

However, Leigh is now better known as a teacher of drawing than as an artist. In 1848, he founded an academy of art, "Leigh's Academy", at 79 Newman Street, off Oxford Street in London. It was well attended and became a formidable rival to the other main London art academy run by Henry Sass ("Sass's Academy"). He was said to be "a first rate teacher and a profound critic in matters of art". Many distinguished artists received their early training at Leigh's academy including Sir Frederic Leighton, Sir John Millais, Philip Hermogenes Calderon, Henry Stacy Marks, Edward Poynter, Joseph Boehm Edwin Long, Henry Holiday, Frederick Walker, John Bagnold Burgess, Walter Goodman Thomas Holroyd, and others.

In his last twenty years, Leigh exhibited no work at any of the recognised exhibitions, instead showing it on the walls of his art academy. He was also in the habit of sketching the same subjects - often of themes from literature - as his students in their drawing classes.

Leigh had been a heavy pipe smoker throughout his life and developed cancer of the throat. He died shortly afterwards in London on 20 April 1860 and was buried on the western side of Highgate Cemetery. His son, Henry Sambrooke Leigh (1837–1883) was a writer and dramatist. After his death, the running of Leigh's art school was taken over by Thomas Heatherley and the school renamed (as was the fashion) "Heatherley's Art School".
