= Frederick Walker (painter) =

British painter (1840–1875)

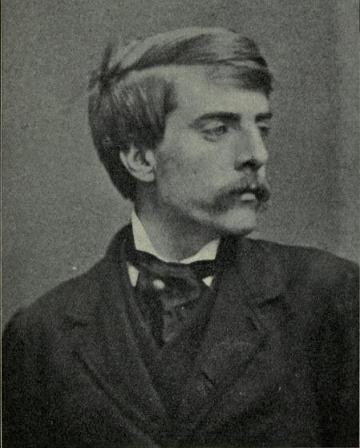
Frederick Walker (from an early photograph)

Frederick Walker ARA RWS (26 May 1840 – 4 June 1875) was a British painter and illustrator. He achieved considerable success in both oils and watercolour before his early death. According to John Everett Millais he was "the greatest artist of the century". His career began as an illustrator, producing line drawings in ink to be turned into wood engravings for magazines and books. He is often regarded as the founder of the Idyllic school in Victorian painting, though that term was not coined until after his death. Among other stylistic trends of his period he sometimes displayed social realism and genre painting sentimentality.

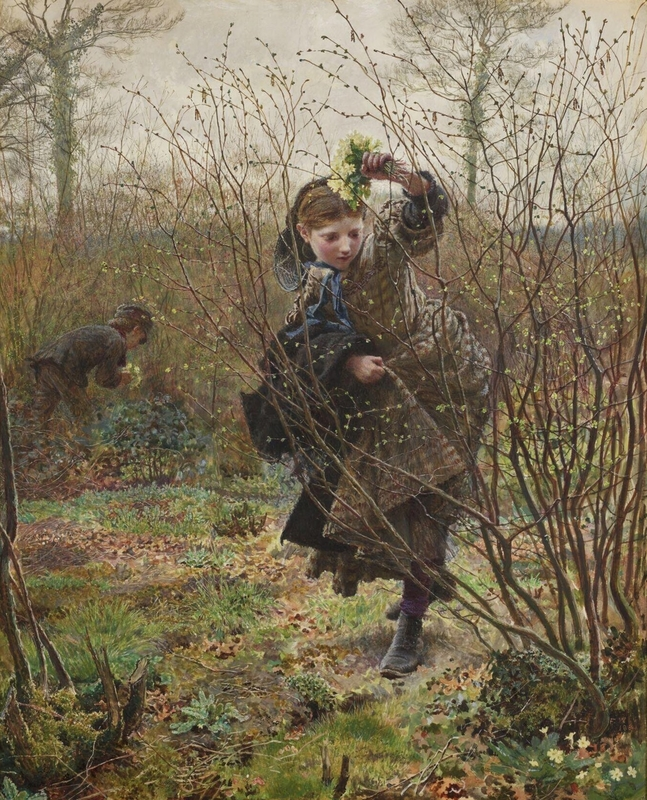
Spring, watercolour, 1864, now Walker's best-known painting, Victoria and Albert Museum

== Life and work ==
=== Early life and training ===
Walker was born at 90 Great Titchfield Street in London as one of eight children: the elder of twins and fifth son of William Henry, jeweller, and Ann (née Powell) Walker. His grandfather, William Walker, had been an artist, who exhibited regularly at the Royal Academy and British Institution in 1782–1802. Fredrick's mother was an embroiderer and became the family's main breadwinner when his father died in 1847.

Walker received his education at a local school and later at the North London Collegiate School in Camden. He showed a talent for art from an early age, teaching himself to copy prints using pen and ink. He also practised drawing in the British Museum. In 1855–1857, he worked in an architect's office in Gower Street, but he gave this up to become a student at the British Museum and at James Mathews Leigh's art school.

In March 1858 he was admitted as a student to the Royal Academy, and later that year became also a part-time apprentice wood-engraver to Josiah Wood Whymper in Lambeth, soon abandoning his Academy classes. During the two years of his apprenticeship he met fellow artists J. W. North and George Pinwell, and he continued to paint in his spare time, in oils and watercolours.

=== As illustrator ===
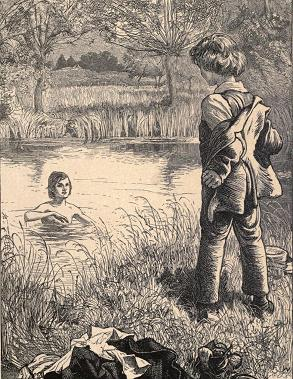
Summer days, book illustration from A Round of days, 1866

In 1859 Walker joined the Artists' Society in Langham Chambers, and from 1860 to 1865 achieved great success as a black-and-white illustrator for popular journals of the day such as Cornhill Magazine, Once a Week, Good Words, Everybody's Journal, and Leisure Hour. Much of his work in this period was engraved by Joseph Swain. He was introduced to the satirist and author William Thackeray, the Cornhill's editor, for whom he provided drawings, such as "Comfort in grief", for The Adventures of Philip, initially published as a serial, then as a book in 1862. He also illustrated Thackeray's unfinished novel Denis Duval, magazine stories by Thackeray's daughter Ann Ritchie – many of the drawings later reproduced in watercolour – and provided drawings such as "Summer days" for the Dalziel brothers, which appeared in two poetry books: "A Round of Days" and "Wayside Posies".

Illustrations and derivative works

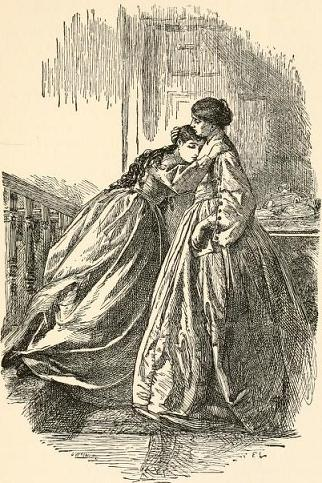
Comfort in grief, 1862

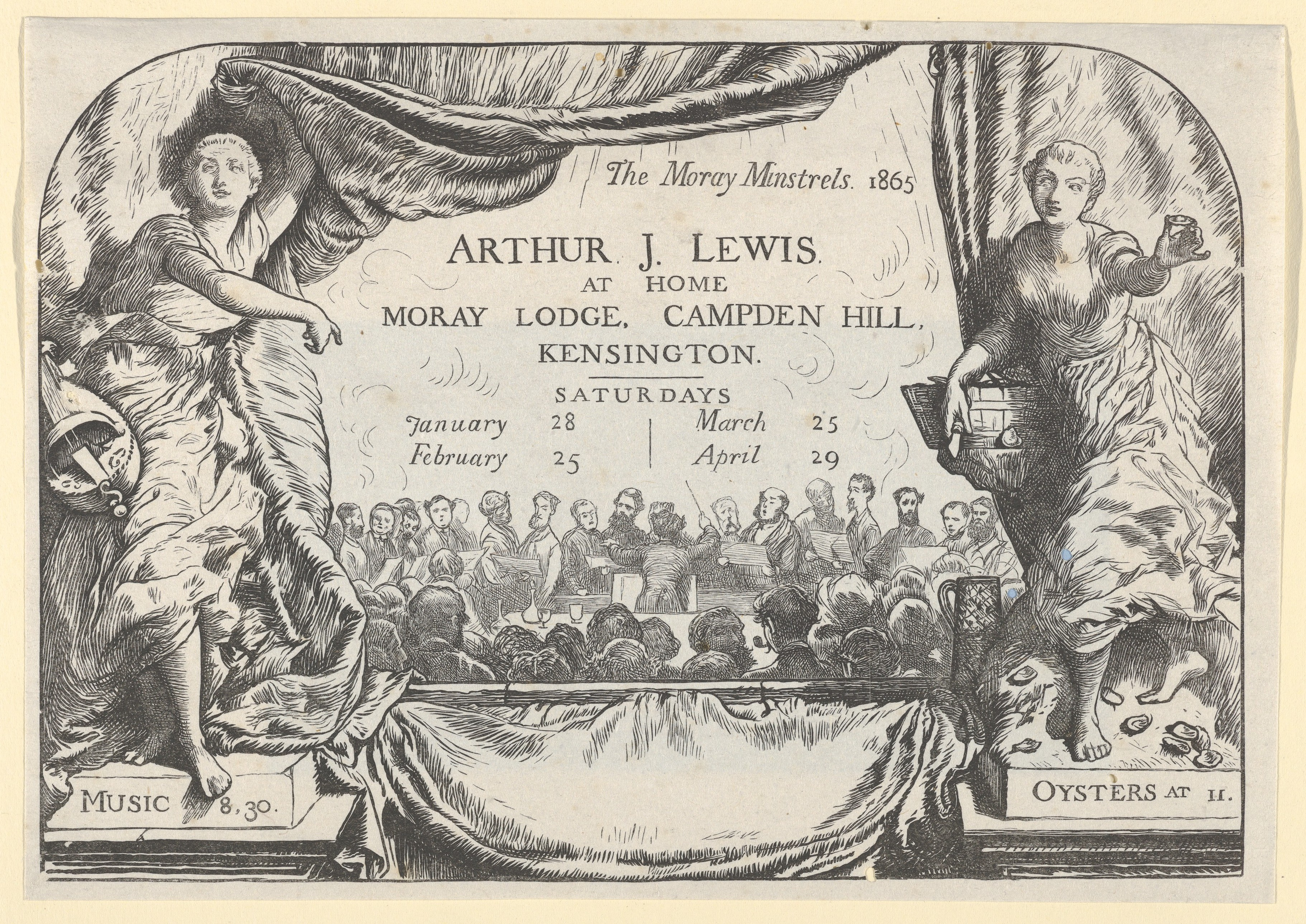
Invitation card to concert by The Moray Minstrels from Arthur James Lewis, 1865

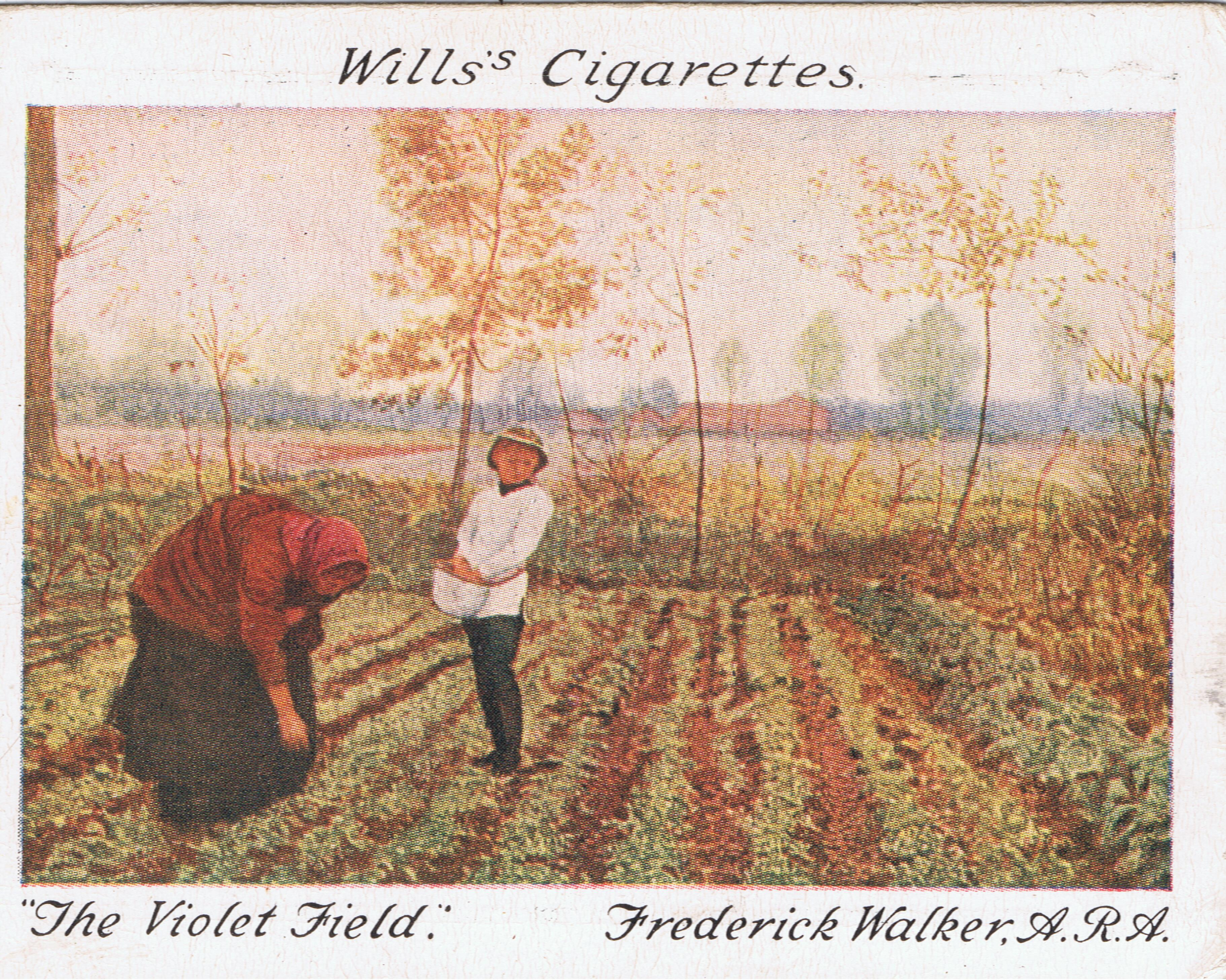
The Violet Field, 1867, as a 1927 Wills's cigarette card

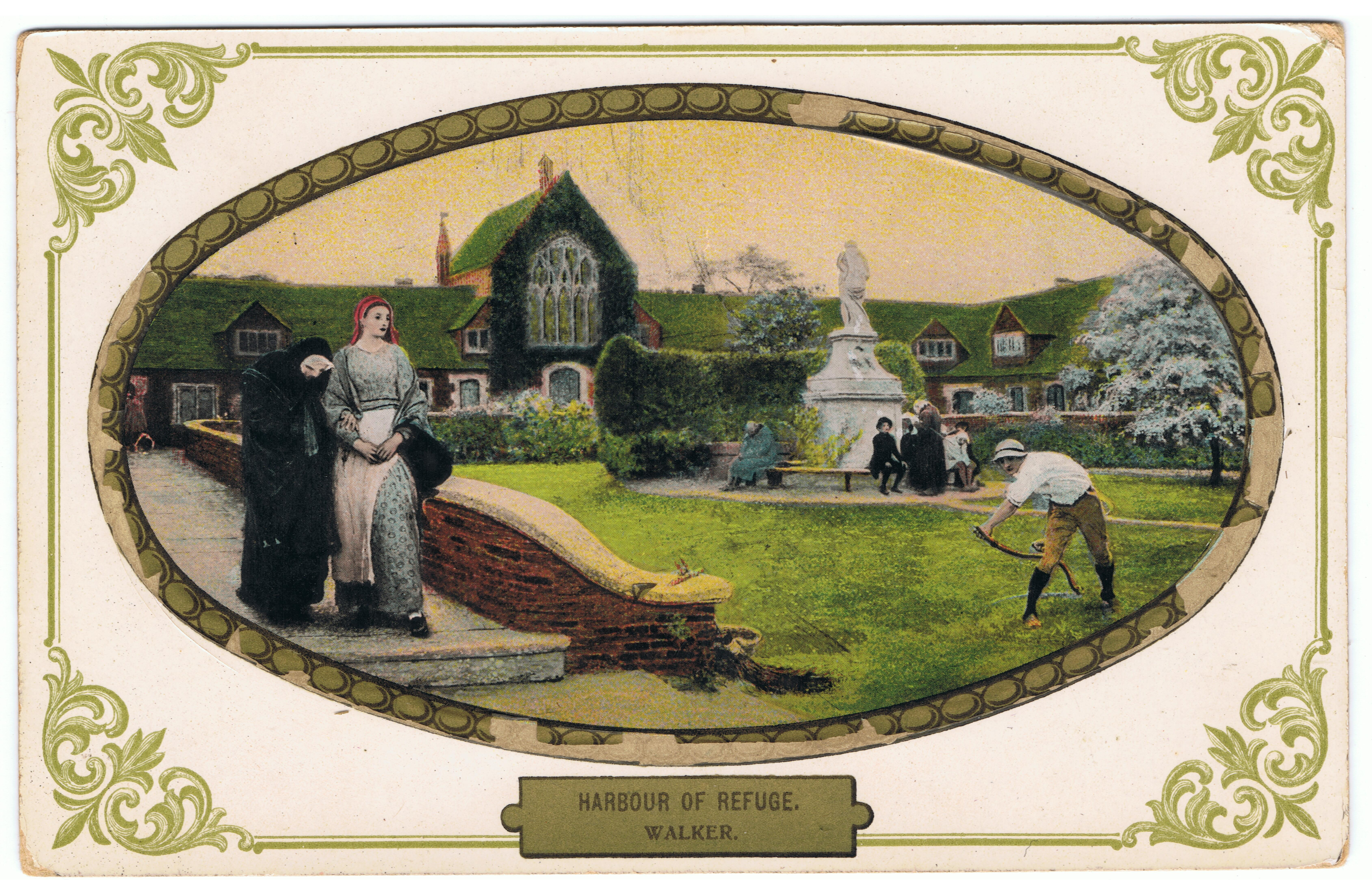
Postcard of The Harbour of Refuge, 1872, sent from Dunoon to Glasgow in 1908

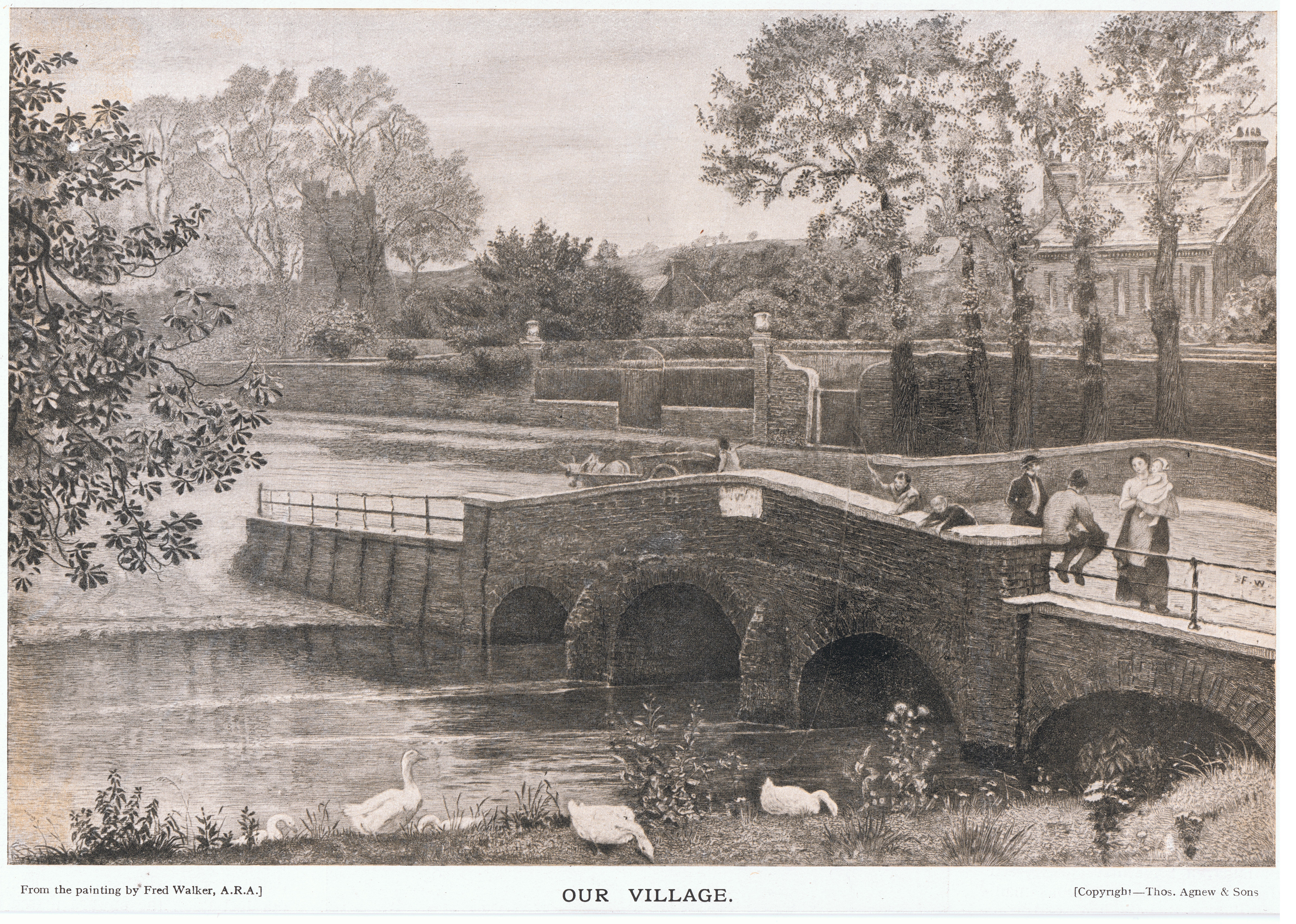
Print of Our Village (Cookham), the original exhibited at the Royal Watercolour Society in 1873

=== As painter ===
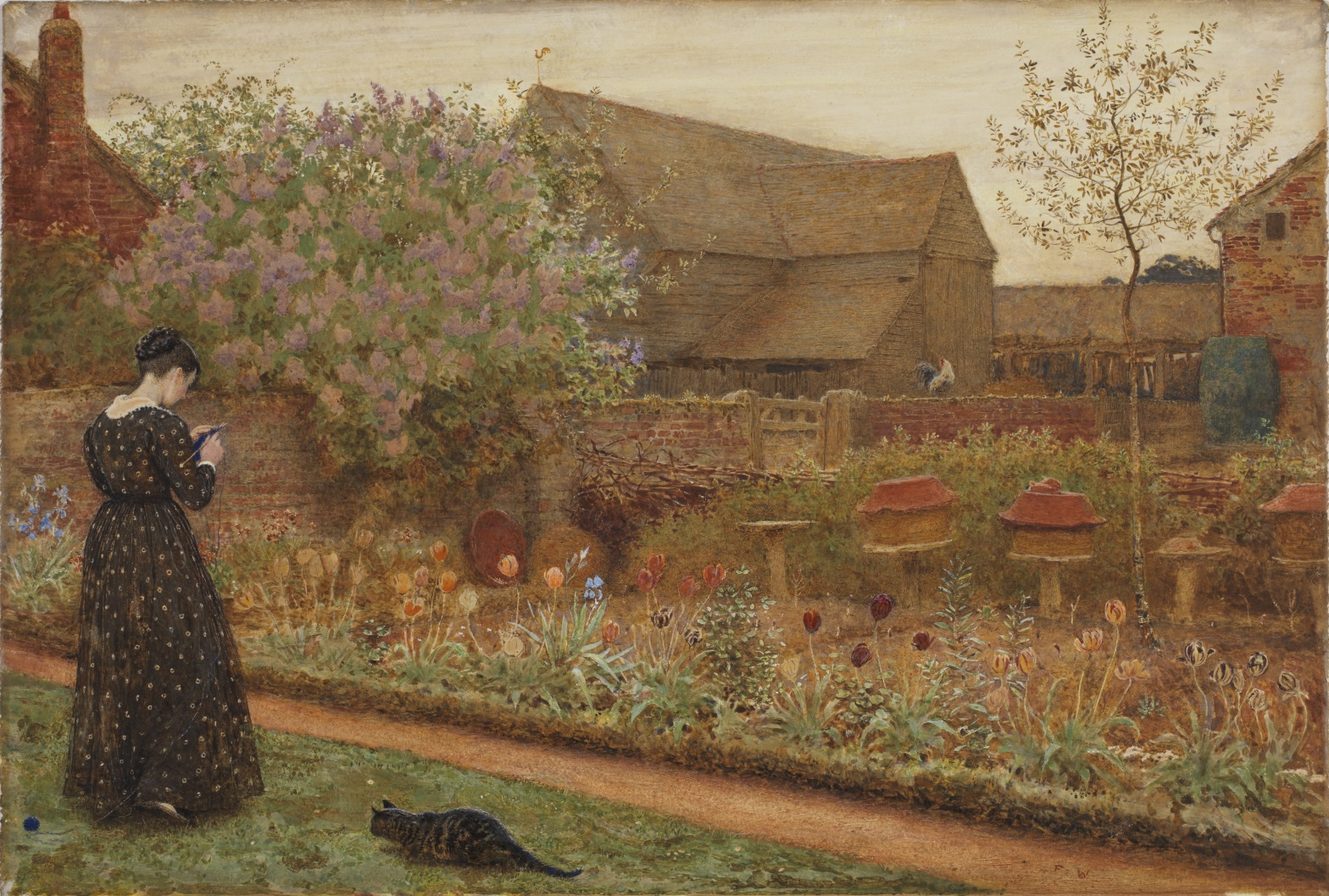
The Old Farm Garden, watercolour, 1871, Courtauld Institute of Art

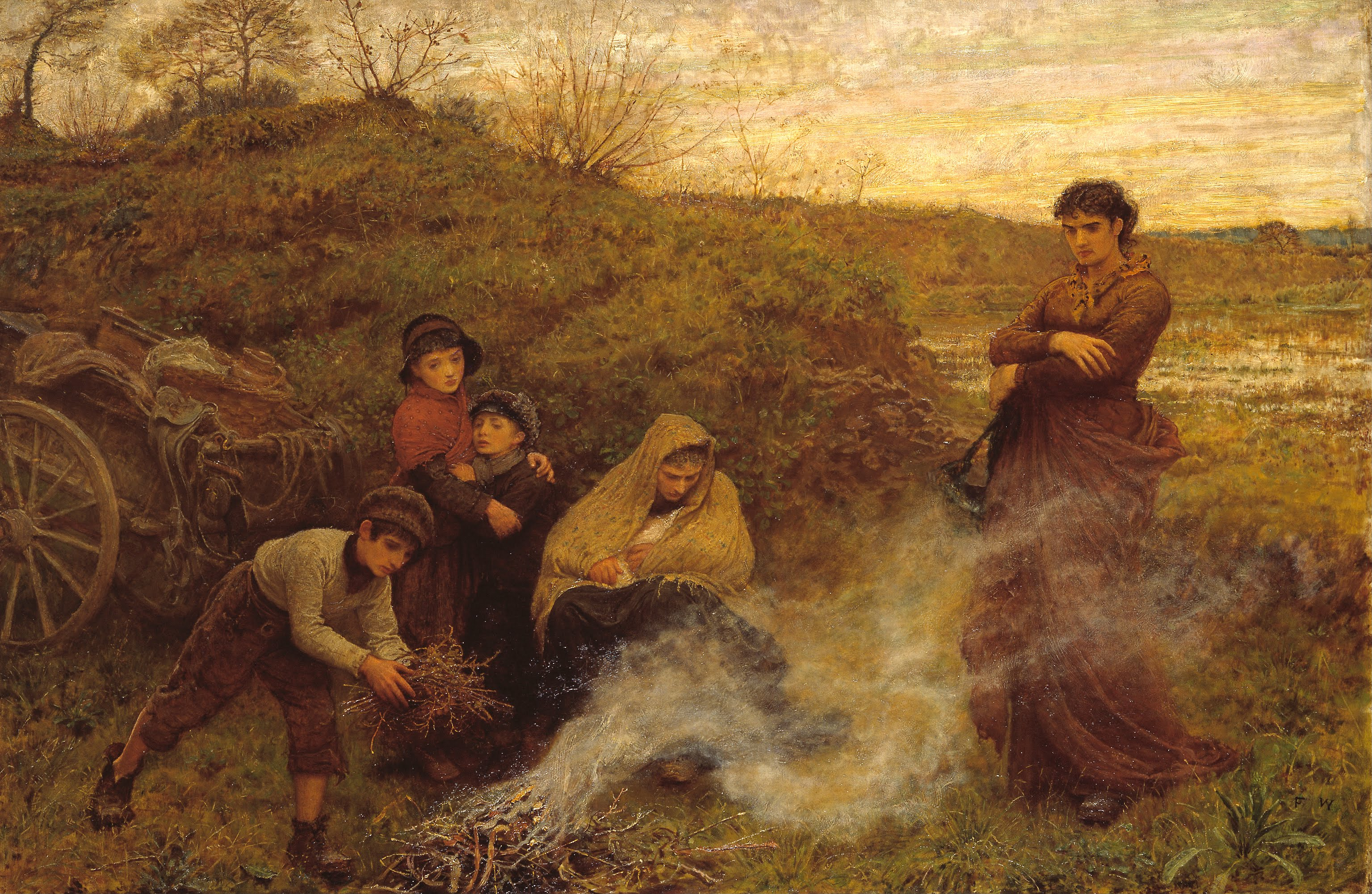
The Vagrants, oils, 1868, Tate Britain

Walker produced his first important watercolour, Strange faces in 1862 (now Yale Center for British Art, New Haven), and in the following year Philip in Church (Tate), which won a medal at the Paris Exhibition of 1867. Walker exhibited at the Royal Watercolour Society from 1864 until the end of his life, becoming an associate member in February 1864 and a full member in 1866, entitling him to add the post-nominal initials RWS to his name. In 1871 he was elected an Associate Royal Academician (ARA), and was elected an honorary member of the Belgian Watercolour Society in the same year.

In 1863 Walker exhibited his first oil painting, The Lost Path at the Royal Academy of Arts. Thereafter he showed Wayfarers (1866, private collection), The Bathers (1867, Lady Lever Art Gallery), Vagrants (1868, Tate, London), The Old Gate (1869; Tate), The Plough (1870; Tate), At the Bar (1871; Untraced), The Harbour of Refuge (1872; Tate, also with a watercolour study there) and The Right of Way (1875; National Gallery of Victoria, Melbourne).

In the final phase of his painting he moved towards a classical treatment of both groups of figures and individual ones, seen in The Bathers of 1867, and The Harbour of Refuge 1872, both large, wide oils, though he repeated the latter in watercolour.

Watercolours

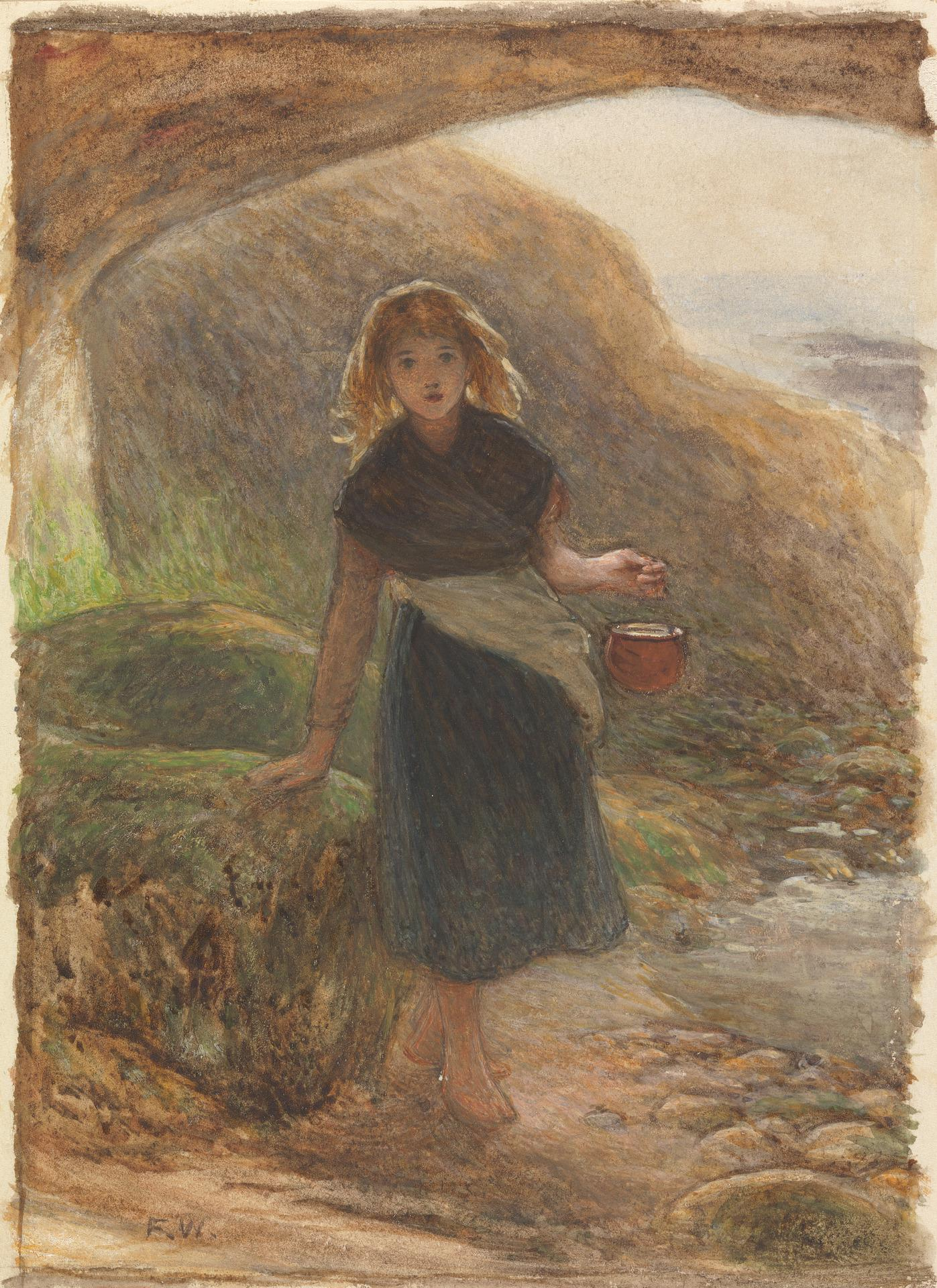
The Mussel Gatherer, 1861, Yale Center for British Art, New Haven

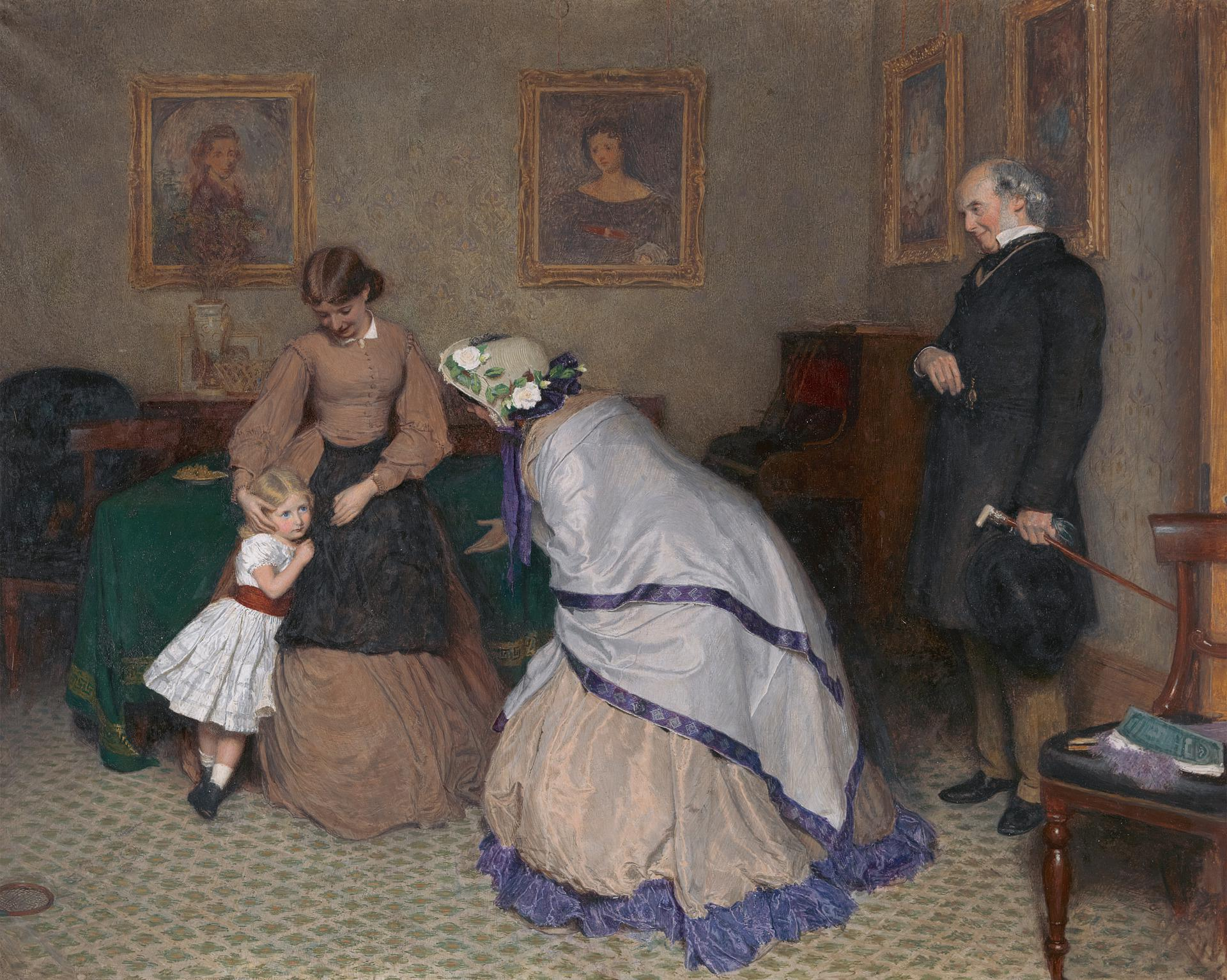
Strange faces, 1862, Yale Center for British Art, New Haven

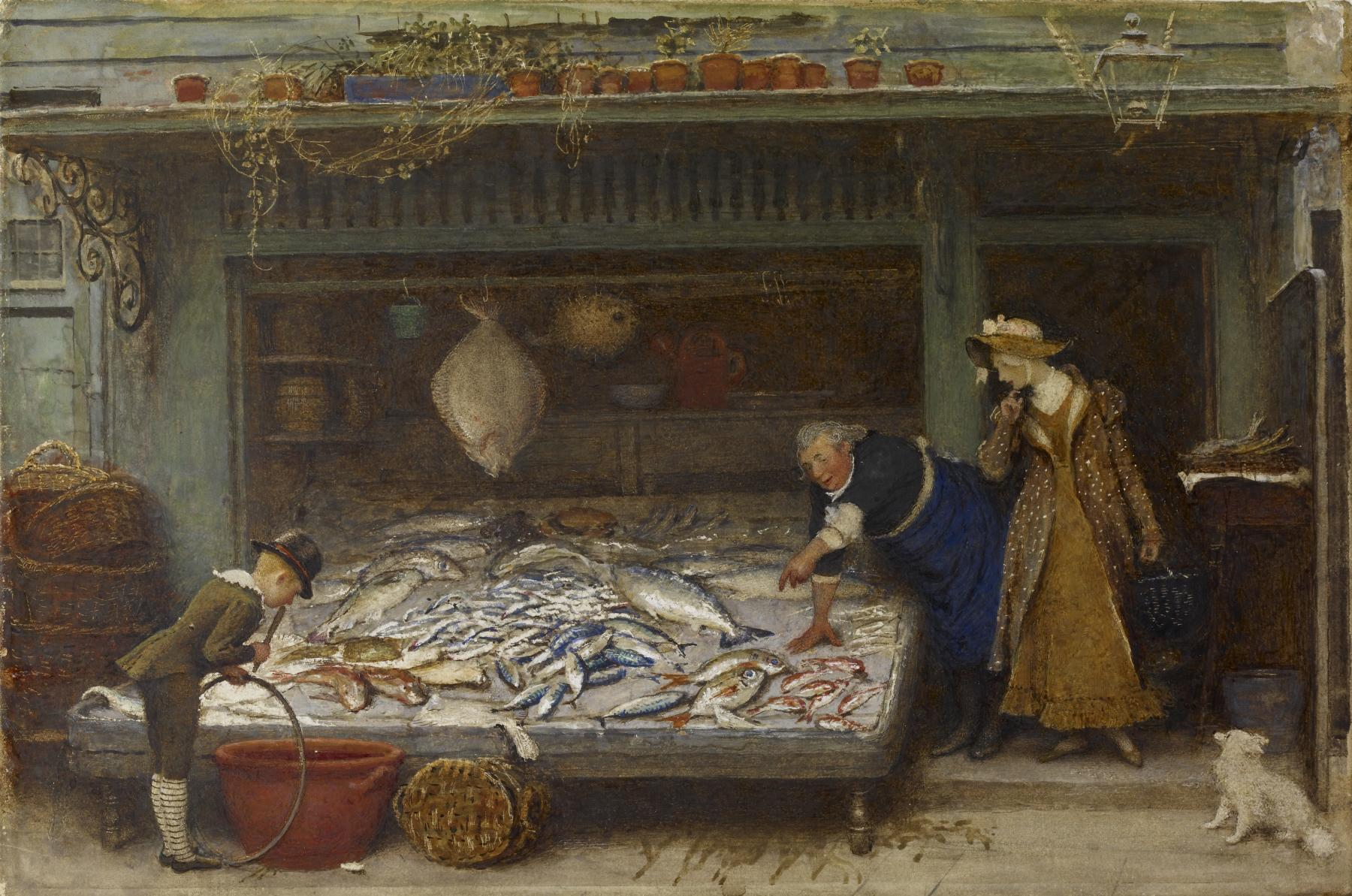
A Fishmonger's Shop, repetition of 1873 painting, Walters Art Museum

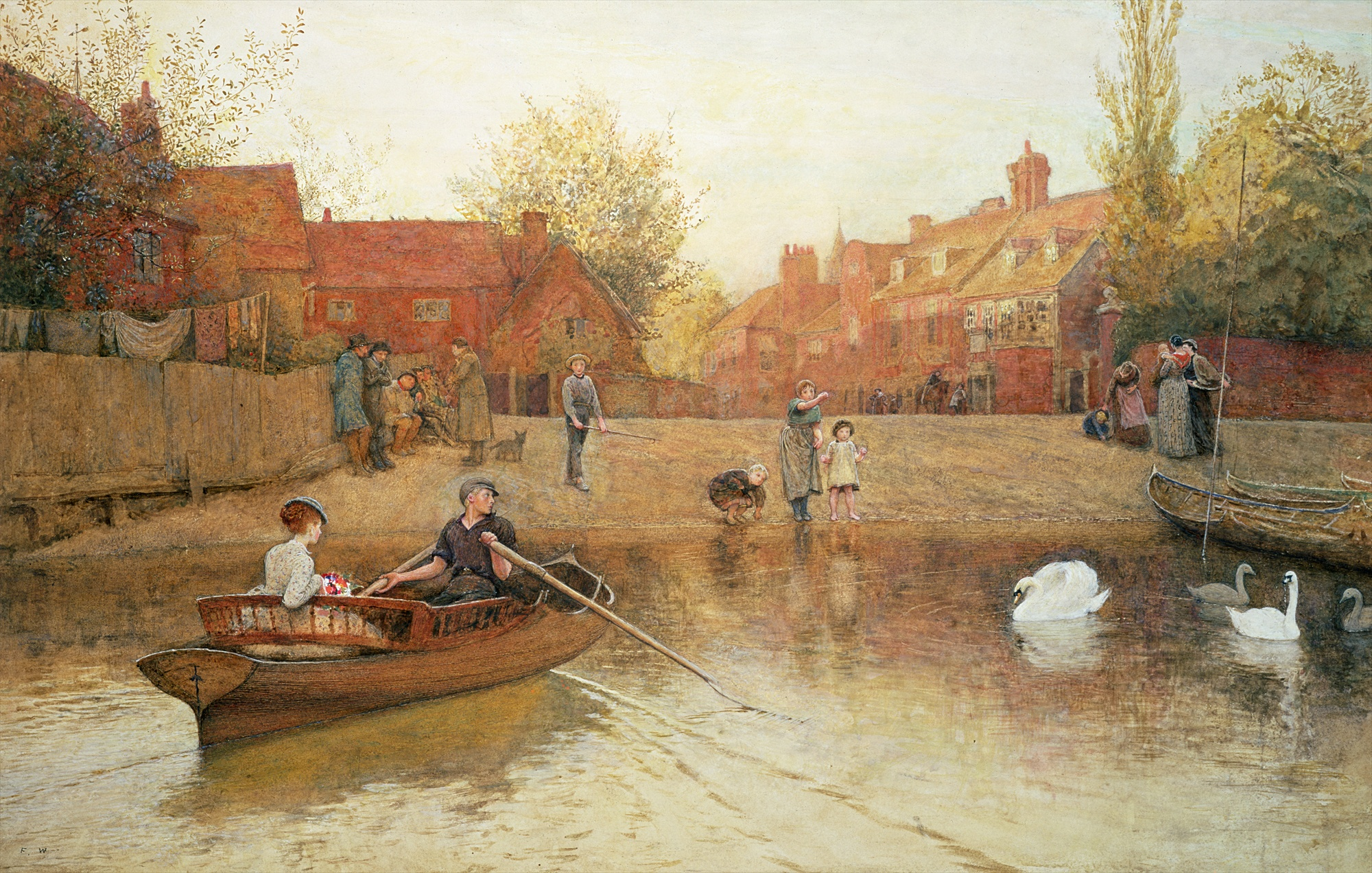
Marlow Ferry, Towneley Hall Art Gallery and Museum

=== Final years ===
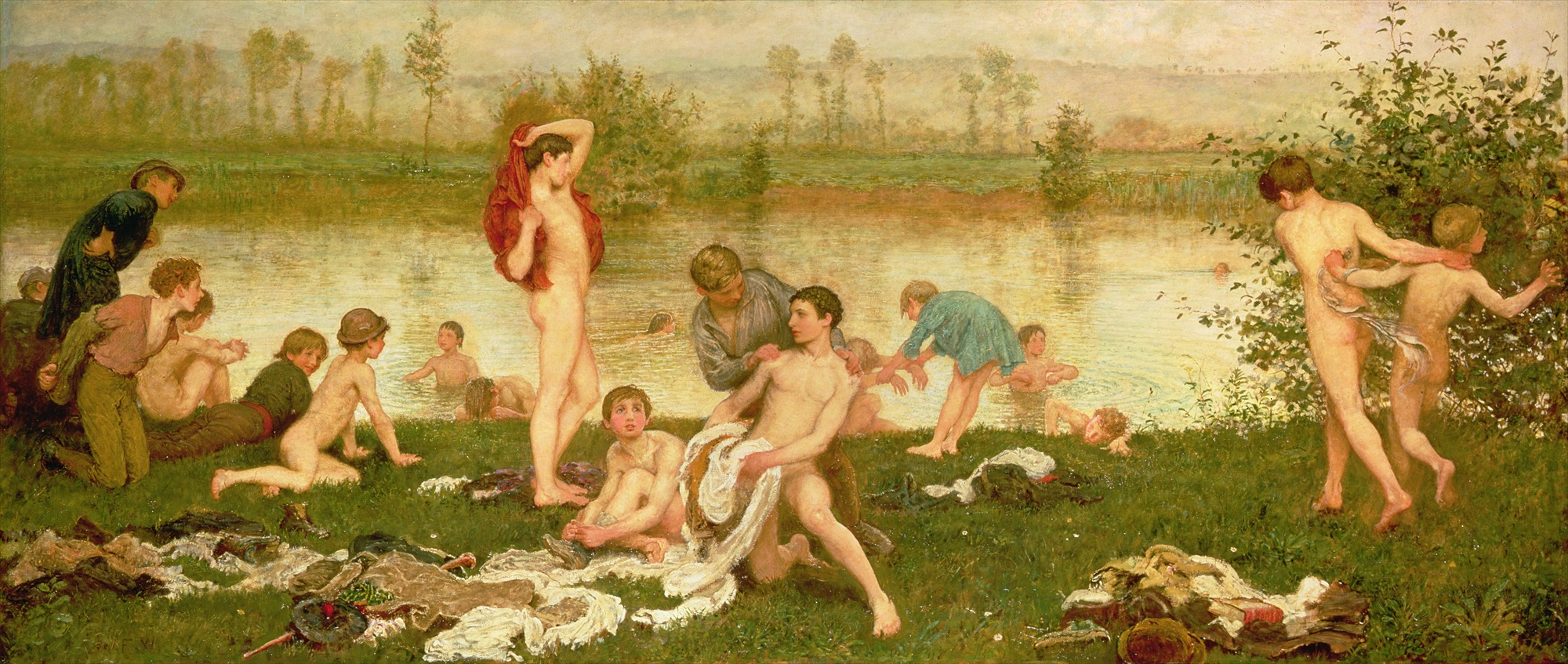
The Bathers (1866–67), oils, Lady Lever Art Gallery

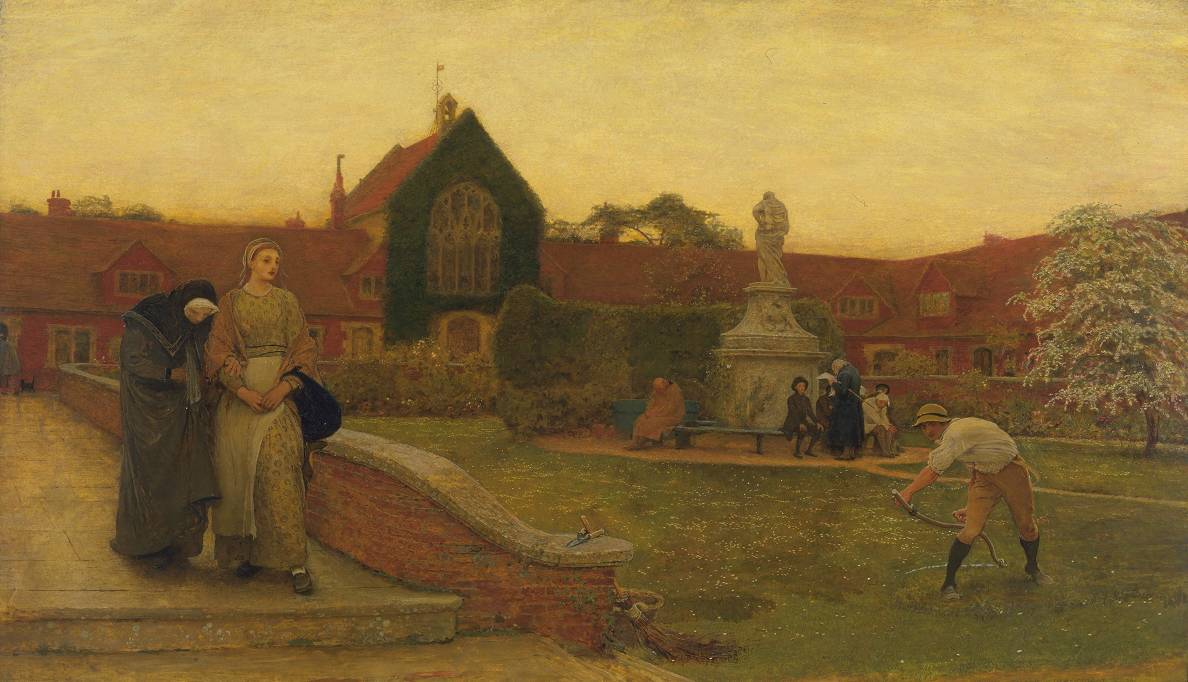
The Harbour of Refuge, 1872, oils, Tate

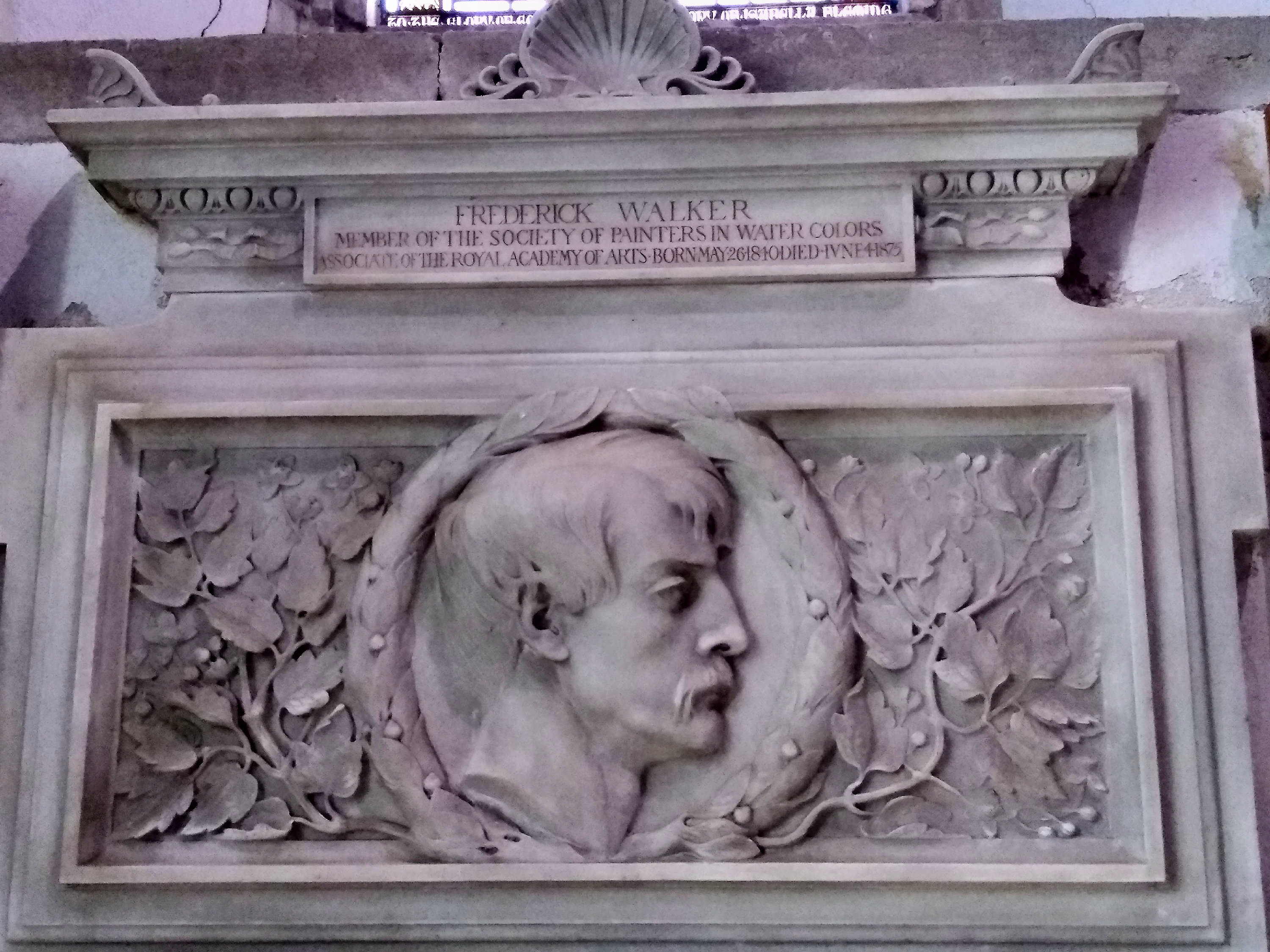
Cookham memorial

Walker never married, spending his life in London with family members: his brother John (died 1868), his sister Fanny (died 1876) and his mother (died 1874). They resided in Bayswater from 1863. He twice visited Paris in 1863 and 1867, and Venice in 1868 and 1870, in the latter case with a friend, William Quiller Orchardson. In 1873 he travelled to Algiers in a failed attempt to recuperate from a bout of tuberculosis that worsened until his death in June 1875 at St Fillans in Perthshire, Scotland. He was buried at Cookham.

=== Books partly illustrated by Walker ===
- W. M. Thackeray, The Adventures of Philip (London: Smith, Elder & Co., 1862)
- George Dalziel, A Round of days (London: Routledge, 1866)
- R. W. Buchanan, Wayside Posies (London: Routledge, 1867)
- W. M. Thackeray,Denis Duval (London: Smith, Elder & Co., 1867)
