= St John's Wood Clique =

Group of Victorian artists

Photograph of the St John's Wood Clique in 1864 or 1865

The St John's Wood Clique was a group of Victorian artists who mostly lived in the St John's Wood area of London. Their ideas were broadly similar to an earlier group also called The Clique. The principal members of the group were Philip Hermogenes Calderon, George Dunlop Leslie, Henry Stacy Marks, George Adolphus Storey, David Wilkie Wynfield, John Evan Hodgson and William Frederick Yeames. According to Graham Reynolds the group was notable for its love of practical jokes.

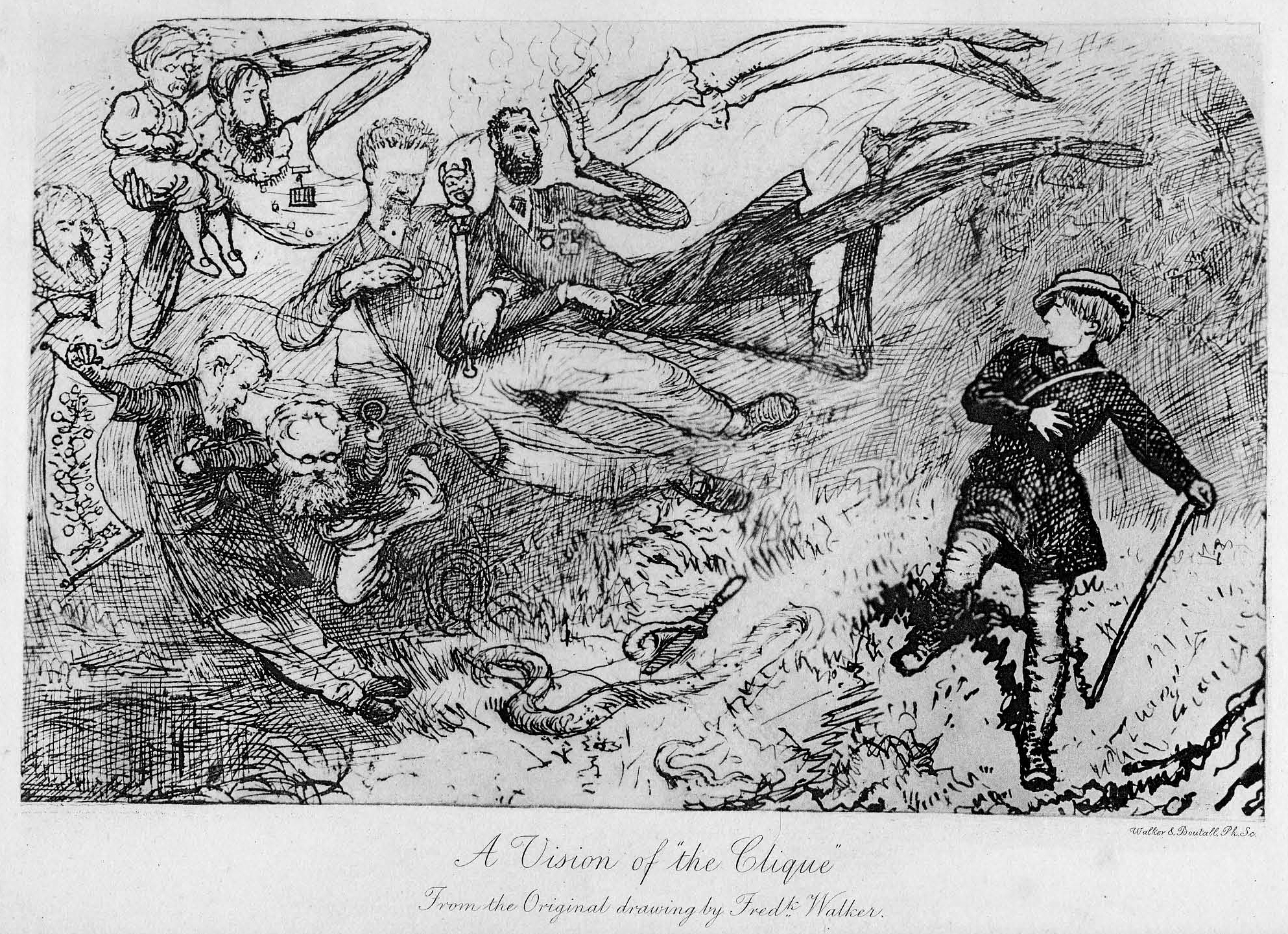
A Vision of the Clique by Frederick Walker

Wynfield took photographs of all the members in fancy dress, along with other notable associates such as John Everett Millais and Manet. Most of the members also belonged to the Artists Rifles.
