= Percy Smythe, 6th Viscount Strangford =

British diplomat

The Right Honourable The Viscount Strangford GCB GCH
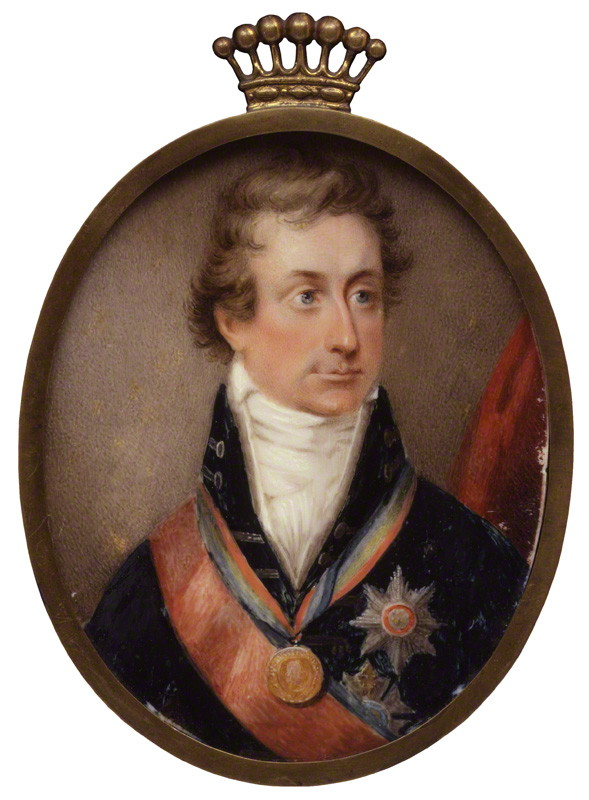
- Portrait by William Haines, c. 1808

British Ambassador Extraordinary and Plenipotentiary to Russia
- In office 1825–1826
- Monarch: George IV
- Preceded by: Edward Thornton
- Succeeded by: Edward Cromwell Disbrowe

British Ambassador to Ottoman Turkey
- In office 1820–1824
- Monarch: George IV
- Preceded by: Bartholomew Frere
- Succeeded by: William Turner

British Envoy Extraordinary and Minister Plenipotentiary to Sweden
- In office 1817–1820
- Monarch: George III
- Preceded by: Edward Thornton
- Succeeded by: Baron FitzGerald

British Envoy Extraordinary and Minister Plenipotentiary to Portugal
- In office 1806–1808
- Monarch: George III
- Preceded by: Earl of Rosslyn and Earl of St Vincent
- Succeeded by: Earl of Clarendon

Personal details
- Born: 31 August 1780
- Died: 29 May 1855 (aged 74)
- Spouse: Ellen Burke (m. 1817; died 1826)
- Children: 8, including George, Percy and Lionel
- Parent(s): Lionel Smythe, 5th Viscount Strangford; Maria Eliza Philipse
- Relatives: Frederick Philipse III (grandfather); Sir John Burke, 2nd Baronet (brother-in-law)
- Education: Harrow School
- Alma mater: Trinity College, Dublin

Percy Clinton Sydney Smythe, 6th Viscount Strangford GCB GCH (31 August 1780 – 29 May 1855) was a British diplomat.

== Early life ==
He was the son of Lionel Smythe, 5th Viscount Strangford (1753–1801) and Maria Eliza Philipse. In 1769, his sixteen-year-old future father left Ireland, joined the army and served during the American War of Independence. While quartered in New York in the winter of 1776 to 1777, he met and courted Maria. She was the daughter of Frederick Philipse III (1720–1785), the third and last Lord of Philipsburg Manor and a descendant of the Dutch founder of the city. At first, her father rejected Lionel, however, as Philipse was a Loyalist during the war, the New York Legislature confiscated his estate, one of the largest in the province, and Philipse changed his mind. They married in September 1779 at Trinity Church in Manhattan and they returned to the United Kingdom. Upon the withdrawal of the British troops from New York in 1783, Philipse also went to England, where he later died.

Smythe was educated at Harrow and graduated from Trinity College, Dublin in 1800, entered the diplomatic service, and in the following year succeeded to the title of Viscount Strangford in the Peerage of Ireland.

He had literary tastes, and in 1803 published Poems from the Portuguese of Camoēns, with Remarks and Notes, Byron at this time describing him as "Hibernian Strangford".

== Diplomatic career ==
=== Ambassador to Portugal ===
In 1806, he served as chargé d'affaires in Portugal under the Earl of Rosslyn and the Earl of St Vincent, who acted as British envoys. In 1807, he was appointed Envoy Extraordinary and Minister Plenipotentiary to Portugal during the reign of King George III.

Following the French invasion of Portugal in 1807, he played a key role in coordinating the transfer of the Portuguese royal court to Brazil. In March 1808, he was sworn in the Privy Council, and on 16 April he was appointed as an envoy to the Portuguese court in Brazil. He subsequently travelled to Rio de Janeiro, where the court had been relocated under the Prince Regent, later John VI, and continued to represent British interests.

During his time in Brazil, which lasted until 1815, he was associated with the negotiation of the 1810 Anglo-Portuguese treaty. The agreement addressed trade relations and included provisions relating to the gradual restriction of Portuguese participation in the transatlantic slave trade.

=== Ambassador to Sweden ===
He was British Envoy Extraordinary and Minister Plenipotentiary at the Court of Stockholm in Sweden from 1817 to 1820, during the reign of Charles XIII of Sweden and Charles XIV John of Sweden.

=== Ambassador to Ottoman Turkey ===
The Levant Company nominated Lord Strangford and his appointment was confirmed in 1820 as the British Ambassador to the Ottoman Empire. He was successful in his efforts to secure the consolidation of the new constitutional settlement between the Ottoman Empire and the Danubian Principalities which followed the revolution in Wallachia in 1821, to persuade the Ottomans to withdraw their troops from the Principalities, and to dissuade the Russian Empire from military intervention.

As ambassador to the Sublime Porte, he had opportunities to assemble fragments of Greek sculpture. Among his collection of antiquities was the "Strangford Shield", a 3rd-century CE Roman marble that reproduces the shield of Athena Parthenos, Phidias' sculpture formerly in the Parthenon. The "Strangford Shield" is conserved in the British Museum. He left Turkey in 1824.

=== Ambassador to Russia ===
From 1825 to 1826, he served as British Ambassador Extraordinary and Plenipotentiary at St. Petersburg, Russia, when he was created Baron Penshurst, of Penshurst in the County of Kent, in the Peerage of the United Kingdom, enabling him to sit in the House of Lords. His diplomatic career went into decline after he was caught falsifying dispatches to the British government and revealing confidential documents to the Austrian ambassador in St Petersburg.

== Personal life ==
In 1817, he married Ellen Burke Browne (1788–1826), daughter of Sir Thomas Burke, 1st Baronet (d. 1813) and sister of Sir John Burke, 2nd Baronet. Ellen had previously been married to Nicholas Browne, Esq., of Mount Hazel, in Galway, with whom she had Katherine Eleanor Browne (d. 1843) who married High-Sheriff Robert French (b. 1799) of Monivea Castle. Together, Percy and Ellen had five children.

- George Augustus Frederick Percy Sydney Smythe (1818–1857), later the 7th Viscount Strangford who had a scandalous relationship with Lady Dorothy, daughter of Horatio Walpole, 3rd Earl of Orford, and who married Margaret Lennox-Kincaid-Lennox, daughter of John Lennox-Kincaid-Lennox shortly before his death. After Smythe's death, she married Charles Bateman-Hanbury-Kincaid-Lennox.
- Philippa Eliza Sydney Smythe (1819–1854), who married Henry James Baillie (1803–1885), the Under-Secretary of State for India.
- Lionel Philip Thomas Henry Smythe (1821–1834), who died young of tuberculosis
- Louisa Ellen Frances Augusta Smythe (1823–1852), who married George Browne, 3rd Marquess of Sligo in 1847.
- Percy Ellen Algernon Frederick William Sydney Smythe (1825–1862), later the 8th Viscount Strangford, who married Emily Anne Beaufort (1826–1887).
- Ellen Sydney Smythe (d. 1852)

After the death of his wife in 1826, Smythe had three children by Katherine Benham (1813–1872), the eldest of whom was the artist.

- Lionel Percy Smythe (1839–1918), the artist

On his death on 29 May 1855, he was succeeded by his eldest son George Smythe, 7th Viscount Strangford, who was an active figure in the Young England movement of the early 1840s. After his death, Benham married William Morrison Wyllie, the artist with whom she had William Lionel Wyllie and Charles William Wyllie, also artists.

=== Honours ===
He was appointed Grand Cross of the Order of the Bath (GCB) in 1815 and Knight Grand Cross of the Royal Guelphic Order (GCH) in 1825. In February 1825, he was elected a Fellow of the Royal Society. He translated the Rimas of Luís de Camões in 1825.

A window in his family chapel in St. Mary's Church, Ashford, Kent, commemorates him, mentioning the monarchs whom he served and the countries to which he was dispatched.

=== Descendants ===
Through his eldest son with Benham, he was the grandfather of Minnie Smythe (1872–1955), also a painter.

Peerage of Ireland
Preceded by Lionel Smythe	Viscount Strangford; 1801–1855	Succeeded by George Smythe
Peerage of the United Kingdom
New creation	Baron Penshurst; 1825–1855	Succeeded by George Smythe
