= Hilary Strain =

- Self-portrait
- Born: 1884; Alloway
- Died: June 2, 1960; Dunkeld
- Occupation: Painter
- Spouse: Harold Wyllie
- Parents: John Strain (father); E. H. Strain (mother)
- Relatives: Laurence Hugh Strain, Helen Mary Strain
- Awards: British War Medal

Euphans Hilary Strain RSMA (1884 – June 2, 1960) was a Scottish portrait and marine painter.

Hilary Strain was born on 1884 in Alloway, Scotland, the younger daughter of engineer John Strain and novelist Euphans Helen McNaughton Strain. A portrait of her as a child by William Charles Thomas Dobson was exhibited at the Royal Academy Exhibition of 1894.

She studied under Maurice Greiffenhagen at the Glasgow School of Art, where she won the Director's Prize in 1922. She also studied with the artist William Lionel Wyllie. She exhibited at the Royal Academy of Arts, Royal Scottish Academy, the Royal Society of Portrait Painters, the Royal Society of Marine Artists, and the Paris Salon.

During World War I she was a driver with the British Expeditionary Force in France. She raced Z-type yachts and rode horses.

Strain married Harold Wyllie, a painter and son of William Wyllie. Hilary Strain died on 2 June 1960 in Dunkeld.
