= William Morrison Wyllie =

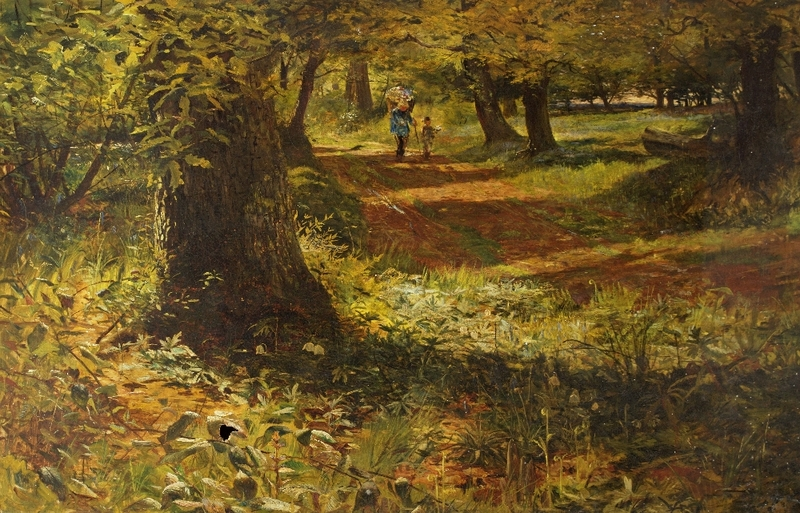
Sunlit Woodland Path (1863; Russell-Cotes Art Gallery & Museum)

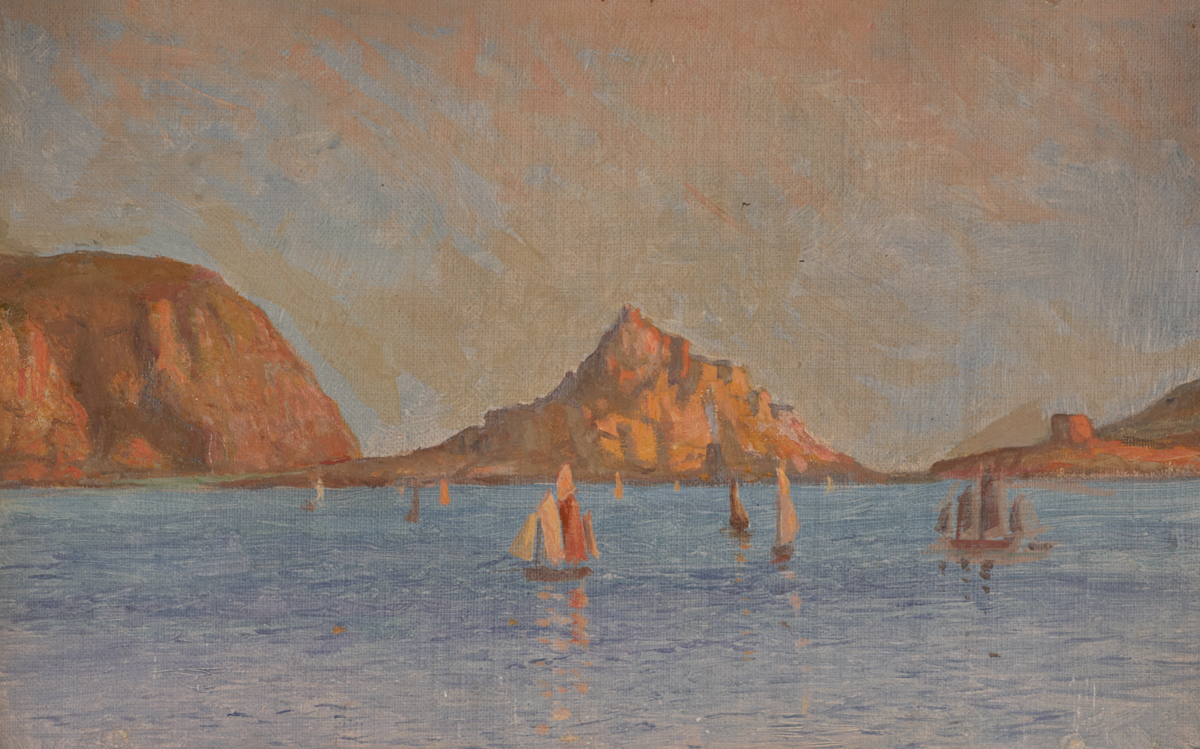
Sailing Boats in Bay (1880; Southwark Art Collection)

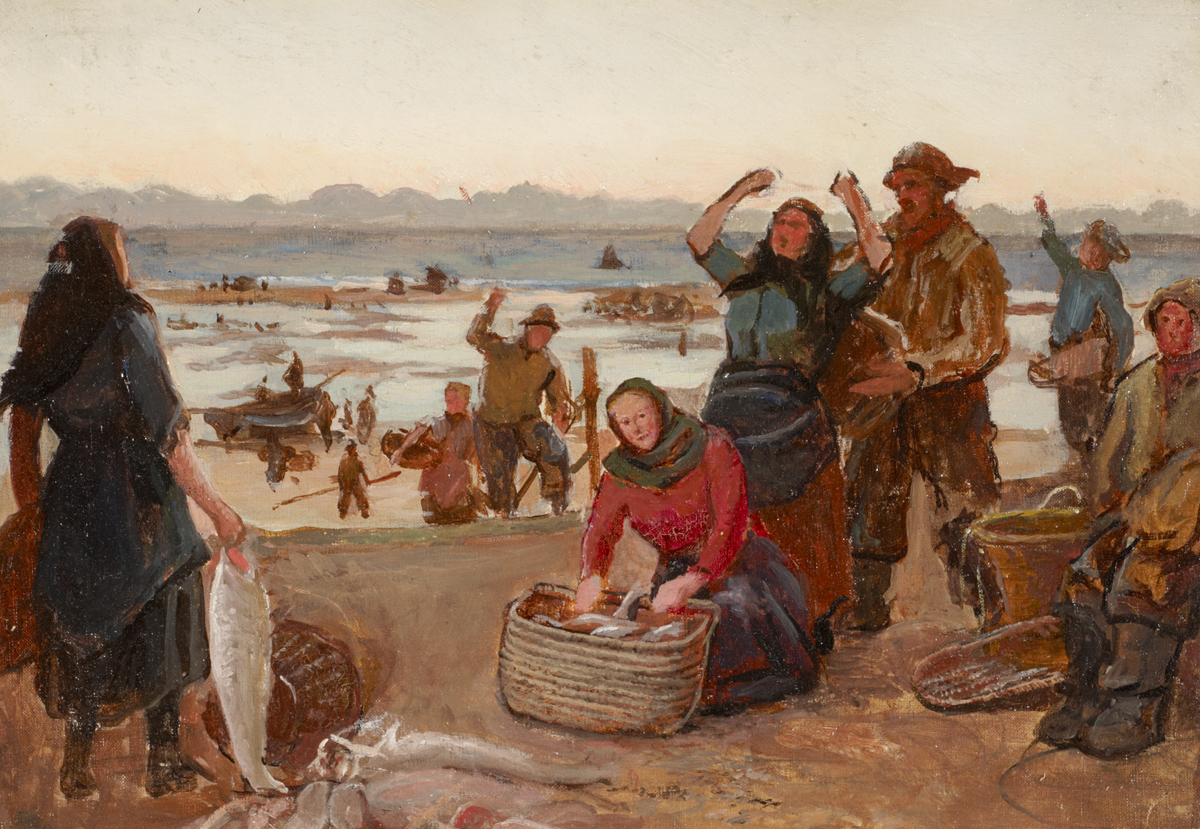
Fisher Girls (Southwark Art Collection)

William Morrison Wyllie (12 December 1820 – 13 March 1895) was a British painter, known for his coastal and maritime subjects. A number of his works are in the Southwark Art Collection. Other collections which hold examples include the Russell-Cotes Art Gallery & Museum.

== Early life ==
Wyllie was born in Aix-les-Bains, Provence, France in 1820 to parents William Wyllie, a gentleman, and Martha Morrison. He was baptised 20 July 1822 in Forfar, Angus.

== Career ==
Wyllie was known for his paintings of maritime and coastal scenes, in both watercolors and oils. His maritime scenes capture coastal living of the French and British in the nineteenth century. Wyllie depicted various types of trading sailboats, along with fishermen and women working along the shore-side, revealing the "labourous fishing industry" and highlighting the workers daily struggles. Other paintings capture traders in past French marketplaces, and The Soldier's Farewell from 1871, captures a young man leaving home to go to war (likely the Franco-Prussian War).

His style is generally loose and Wyllie is known for his ability to capture "large sun-blushed skies and rolling, powerful seas" that "charge his paintings with dramatic moods."

He also painted two interiors of parliament; the first was in 1878 of the House of Commons, and the second was of the House of Lords in 1883. The paintings are said to have "successfully capturing the atmospheres of Britain's political chambers" and both are held in the collection of the Palace of Westminster.

== Personal life ==
In 1851, Wyllie married Katherine Benham (1813–1872), a singer who was the companion of Percy Smythe, 6th Viscount Strangford, the British Ambassador to Russia, Ottoman Turkey, Sweden, and Portugal, following the death of his first wife in 1826 until Strangford's death. From Katherine's earlier relationship with Strangford, William became stepfather to three children, including the artist Lionel Percy Smythe. After their marriage, the couple lived in London and Wimereux, France. Together, they were the parents of two sons, who were both successful painters, as was his stepson:

- William Lionel Wyllie (1851–1931)
- Charles William Wyllie (1853–1923)

Wyllie died in Hoo, Kent in 1895.

=== Descendants ===
Through his eldest son, William Lionel, he was the grandfather of fellow painter and Lt. Col. Harold Wyllie.
