= Lionel Smythe =

English painter (1839–1918)

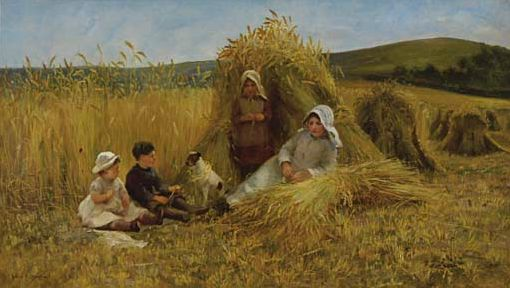
The Midday rest

Lionel Percy Smythe RA RWS RI ROI (4 September 1839 – July 1918) was a British artist, and etcher.

== Life and work ==
Lionel Percy Smythe was the illegitimate son of Percy Clinton Sydney Smythe, 6th Viscount Strangford and Katherine Benham (later Mrs Wyllie). He was born in London in 1839 and spent his early years in France, where his younger sister and brother were born. The family returned to London in 1843 and lived in Gloucester Crescent, Camden). Smythe was educated at King's College School. He was also partly educated in France and spent holidays there at Wimereux in Normandy with his stepfather William Morrison Wyllie and family. He trained in art at the Heatherley School of Fine Art. He was half brother of the artists William Lionel Wyllie and Charles William Wyllie.

Smythe exhibited at the Royal Academy from 1863 (becoming a member in 1911) and the Royal Institute of Painters in Watercolours from 1881 (becoming a member in 1880) - he eventually transferred his allegiance to the Royal Watercolour Society in 1892, becoming a member in 1894. Smythe painted rural landscapes, genre and maritime scenes, people and animals in both oils and watercolours, and became associated with the Idyllists.

A painting by Smythe and William Overend of a rugby union football game drew notable interest from intrigued crowds at The Exposition Universelle de 1889 in Paris. The work, which depicts the 1886 Scotland-England rugby union match, is now lost.

Smythe and his wife Alice made frequent trips to France and eventually settled in Normandy in 1879, in an old Napoleonic fortress on the coast at Wimereux - until the building was inundated by the sea. Subsequently, they moved, in 1882, to the Château d'Honvault on a hill between Wimereux and Boulogne. The couple had three children, of whom Minnie Smythe also became a painter. Smythe lived and worked here until his death in 1918, the countryside and rural life of the area becoming the main inspiration for his art.

== Selected works ==
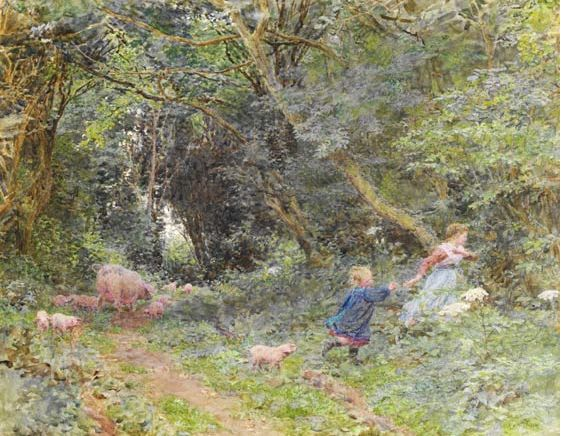
Under the Greenwood Tree (watercolour, 1902)

- The Arabian Nights (1865)
- Shorthanded (1874, marine)
- Field of the cloth of gold: Twixt Calais and Guines (1883)
- Mowers with elm trees
- The First Buds of Spring (1885)
- Springtime (1885)
- Germinal (1889)
- Harvesters returning
- Children fording a river by a continental town (1891)
- Boulogne fishing folk (1893)
- La Tricoteuse
- Bleaching linen (pre 1896)
- Caught in the frozen palms of spring
- Spring outing
- Under the Greenwood Tree (1902)
- The Farmyard at Château d'Honvault, Wimereux (1908)
- The Adoration (1909)
- The Harvester (1910)
- Summer
- Shrimpers
- A Thick Night Off the Goodwins (marine)
- The Bait Digger (1910)
- When life is hard its better to be young (1911)
- Hounds
