= E. H. Strain =

- Born: December 25, 1851; Auchinleck
- Died: March 11, 1934; Cassillis House
- Spouse: John Strain
- Children: Laurence Hugh Strain, Helen Mary Strain, Hilary Strain

Euphans Helen McNaughton Strain (December 25, 1851 – March 11, 1934) was a Scottish novelist.

Euphans Helen McNaughton was born on December 25, 1851 in Auchinleck, the daughter of James McNaughton, a railway contractor, and Ellen Ferrier. She was educated at Grange House School in Edinburgh and Glasgow University.

Her A Man's Foes (1896) is a historical novel about the 1689 Siege of Derry from an anti-Catholic point of view. The novel is narrated by the wife of a Captain Hamilton. The Daily Mail called it the best historical novel since Micah Clarke (1889). School in Fairyland (1896) is an allegory illustrated by Leonard Leslie Brooke. Elmslie's Drag-Net (1900) is a collection of short stories. Laura's Legacy (1903) is a melodrama about Lady Laura, a foundling and budding playwright Eve, and Laura's nephew Hugh, who manages a theatre. A Prophet's Reward (1908) is another historical novel, this one about Scottish politics in the 18th century.

Strain and her husband were friends with Robert Louis Stevenson and their visit to him in Samoa was the subject of a number of travel articles for The Scotsman.

Euphans Helen Strain died on 11 March 1934 in Cassillis House, Maybole.

== Personal life ==
She married Scottish engineer John Strain on 13 August 1874. They had a son and two daughters:

- Colonel Laurence Hugh Strain OBE DSC KC (d. 1952), a World War I pilot with the Royal Naval Air Service.
- Helen Mary Strain, who married Kenneth Alfred Wolfe Barry, son of engineer Sir John Wolfe Barry.
- Euphans Hilary Strain (1884–1960), a portrait painter who married another painter, Harold Wyllie.

== Bibliography ==
- A Man's Foes, Ward, Lock & Bowden, London, 1896
- School in Fairyland, T. F. Unwin, London, 1896
- Elmslie's Drag-Net, Methuen & Co., London, 1900
- Laura's Legacy, T. F. Unwin, London, 1903
- A Prophet's Reward, W. Blackwood & Sons, Edinburgh & London, 1908
