= William Lionel Wyllie =

English painter (1851–1931)

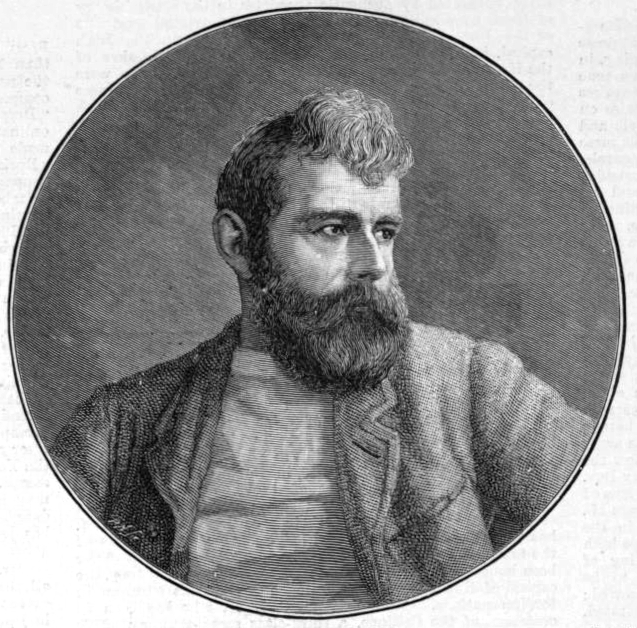
- An engraved portrait of W. L. Wyllie from The Illustrated London News of 4 May 1889
- Born: 5 July 1851; Camden Town, London, United Kingdom
- Died: 6 April 1931 (aged 79); Primrose Hill, London, United Kingdom
- Education: Heatherley School; Royal Academy
- Known for: Maritime watercolours and oils
- Awards: Turner Gold Medal (1869)

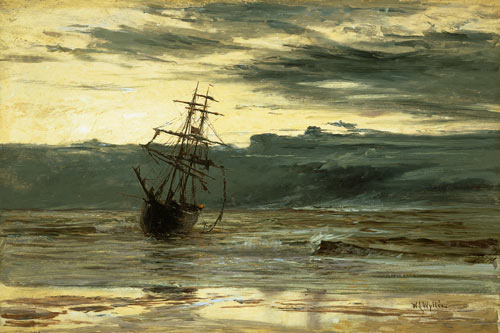
Dawn after a Storm, 1869, which won Wyllie a Turner Gold Medal at the age of 18

William Lionel Wyllie (5 July 1851 – 6 April 1931), also known as W. L. Wyllie, was a prolific English painter of maritime themes in both oils and watercolours. He has been described as "the most distinguished marine artist of his day." His work is in the Tate, the Royal Academy, the Imperial War Museum, the National Maritime Museum, the National Museum of the Royal Navy, and many other institutions around the world.

== Life and career ==
=== Birth ===
Wyllie was born on 5 July 1851 at 67 Albany Street, Camden Town, London, the elder son of William Morrison Wyllie (1820–1895), a prosperous minor-genre painter living in London and Wimereux, France, by his wife Katherine Benham (1813–1872), a singer. Before marrying W.M. Wyllie, she had had three illegitimate children by Percy Clinton Sydney Smythe, 6th Viscount Strangford, one of whom, Lionel Smythe, also became a noted artist.

=== Early life and education ===
Most of Wyllie's early summers were spent in France with his parents. He began to draw from an early age, and his natural talent was encouraged by his father and by his step brother, Lionel. He was given a thorough artistic education; first at the Heatherley School of Fine Art, and then in 1866, aged 15, at the Royal Academy Schools. At the Royal Academy he studied under Edwin Henry Landseer, John Everett Millais and Frederic Leighton, among others. He further demonstrated his precocious talent when he won the Turner Gold Medal in 1869 at the age of eighteen with Dawn after a Storm. His other early love affair, which he shared with his younger brother and fellow artist Charles William Wyllie (1853–1923), was sailing.

=== Artistic career ===
From the early 1870s Wyllie worked as an illustrator of maritime subjects for The Graphic. In 1875, the academy rejected two of his works, and in anger he declared his intention to give up art for a career at sea. Over the course of several sailing cruises as far afield as Europe he laid the foundations for a lifelong love of the sea and of maritime subjects.

Wyllie was a prolific exhibitor, with paintings and etchings shown at the Royal Academy, the Royal Institute of Oil Painters, the Royal Institute of Painters in Water Colours, the Royal Society of Painter-Etchers and Engravers, the Grosvenor Gallery, the New English Art Club, the Society of British Artists, the Dowdeswell Galleries and the Fine Art Society.

Wyllie became a member of the Society of British Artists in 1875, and of the Royal Institute of Painters in Water Colours in 1882. In 1887 he became a member of the New English Art Club. In 1889 he was made an associate of the Royal Academy, and in 1907 he was elected as a full member. In 1903 he became a member of the Royal Society of Painter-Etchers and Engravers.

In 1920 he painted a mural for the Royal Exchange, London Blocking of Zeebrugge Waterway, St George’s Day, 23rd April 1918.

Wyllie campaigned vigorously for the restoration of HMS Victory as a founder member of the Society for Nautical Research, and in 1930 his 42-foot (13 m) panorama of the Battle of Trafalgar was unveiled by King George V. The painting is seen by about 100,000 people every year where it still hangs in the Royal Naval Museum within the Historic Dockyard at Portsmouth.

Wyllie was considered among the most celebrated British maritime painters of his era by his contemporaries. His impact on the maritime communities around Great Britain during his life was great enough that he was buried with full naval honors after his death in 1931.

=== Marriage ===
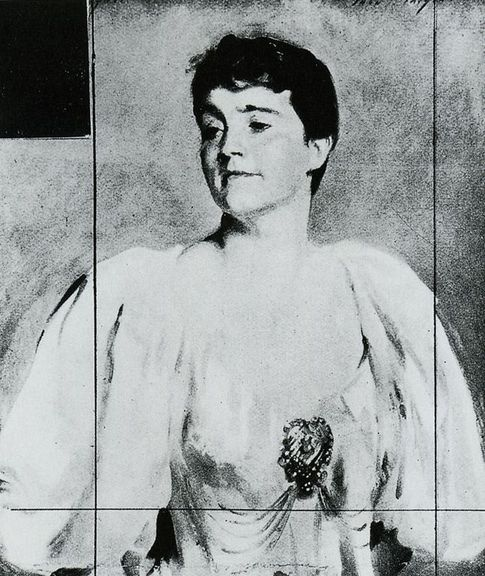
Marian Amy Carew Wyllie, portrait by John Singer Sargent

In 1876, at the age of 25, he became engaged to the 16-year-old Marion Amy Carew (31 December 1860–26 July 1937). They were married in 1879, and between 1880 and 1904 they had nine children; Harold (1880–1973), William Thomas "Bill" (1882–1916), Richard John "Dick" (1886-1963), Eva (Note: On her grave, which she shares with W L Wyllie, she is described as their "Invalid daughter") (1884–1912), Robert Theodore Morrison (1888–1914), Douglas (b&d 1894), an unnamed son (b&d 1898), Eric Ian Carew (1900-1973) and Aileen Doreen (1903–1987). Bill and Robert were killed in the First World War and Eva also died before her father.

=== Death ===
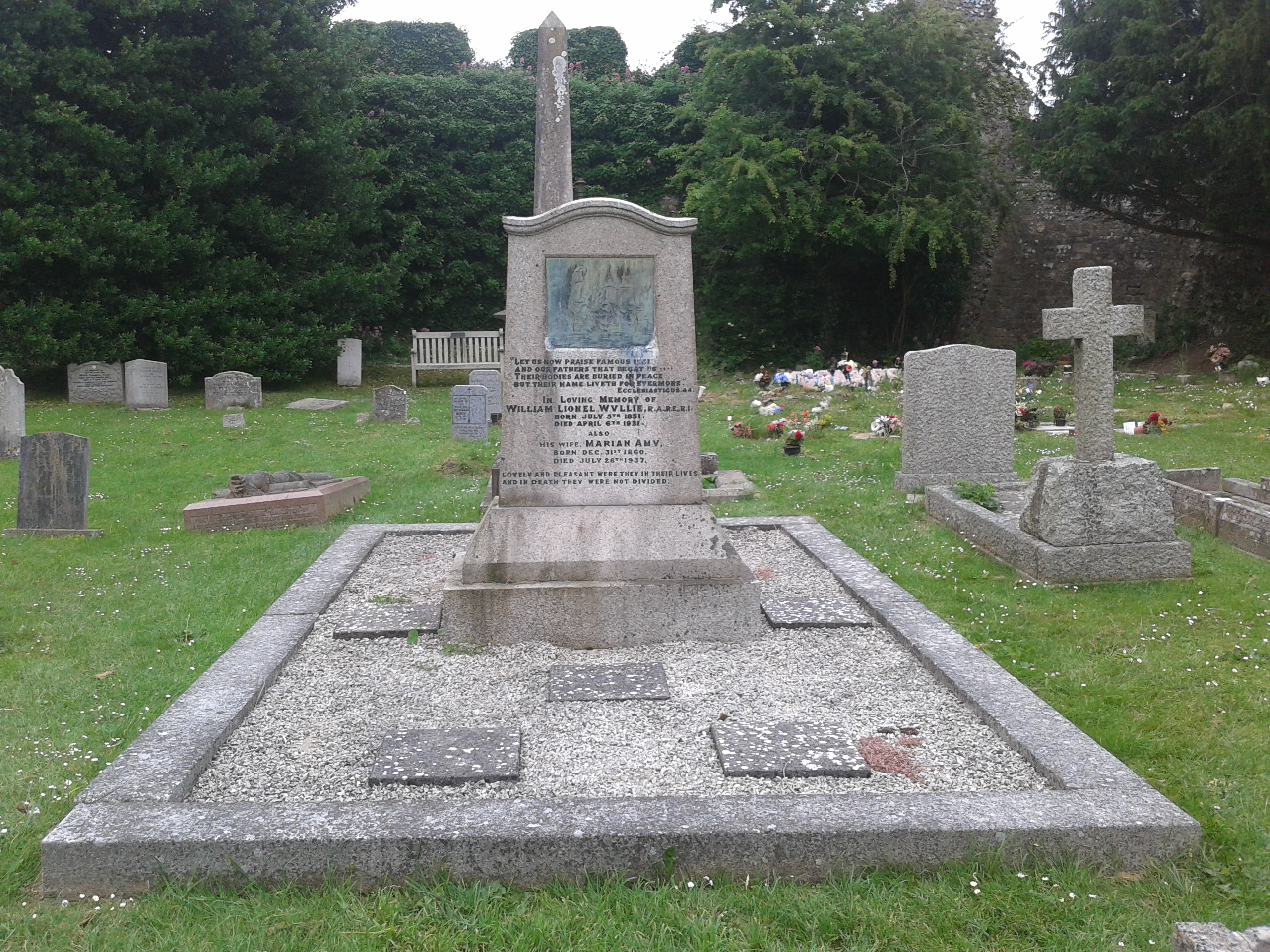
The grave of W. L. Wyllie, and his wife Marion. Also interred in the same plot are his daughters Eva and Aileen

Remaining active in his final years, Wyllie continued to sail and paint. His work on the Trafalgar panorama was physically difficult, with much of the painting being done from step ladders, and on most days the work lasted from 10:00 until 17:00 with a short sleep at lunchtime. His daughter Aileen later remarked "At the time it seemed natural, but now that I am old, I cannot think how he did those hours on ladders in his 79th year." Wyllie died on 6 April 1931 at 102 Fellows Road, Primrose Hill, London, and is buried at St Mary's church, within the grounds of Portchester Castle.

== Selected works ==
=== Paintings, drawings and etchings ===
The works of W L Wyllie

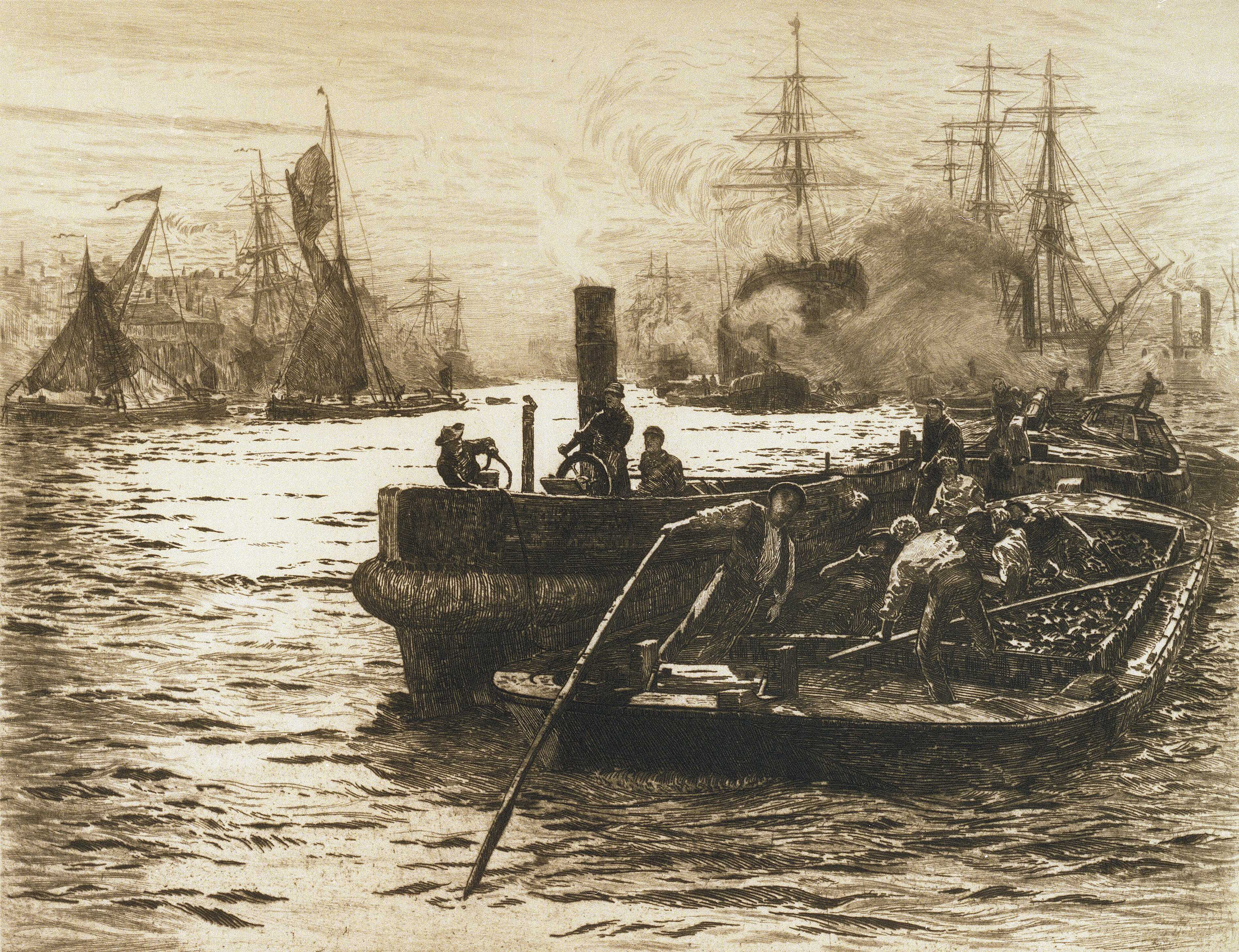
Toil, Glitter, Grime and Wealth on a Flowing Tide

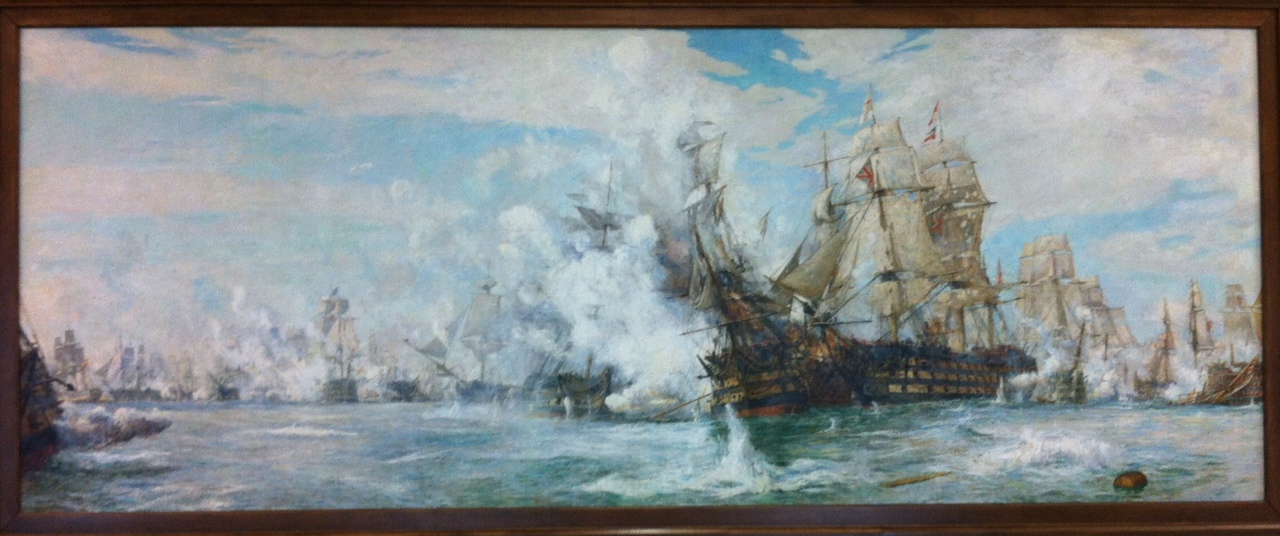
Battle of Trafalgar, Juno Tower, CFB Halifax, Nova Scotia, Canada

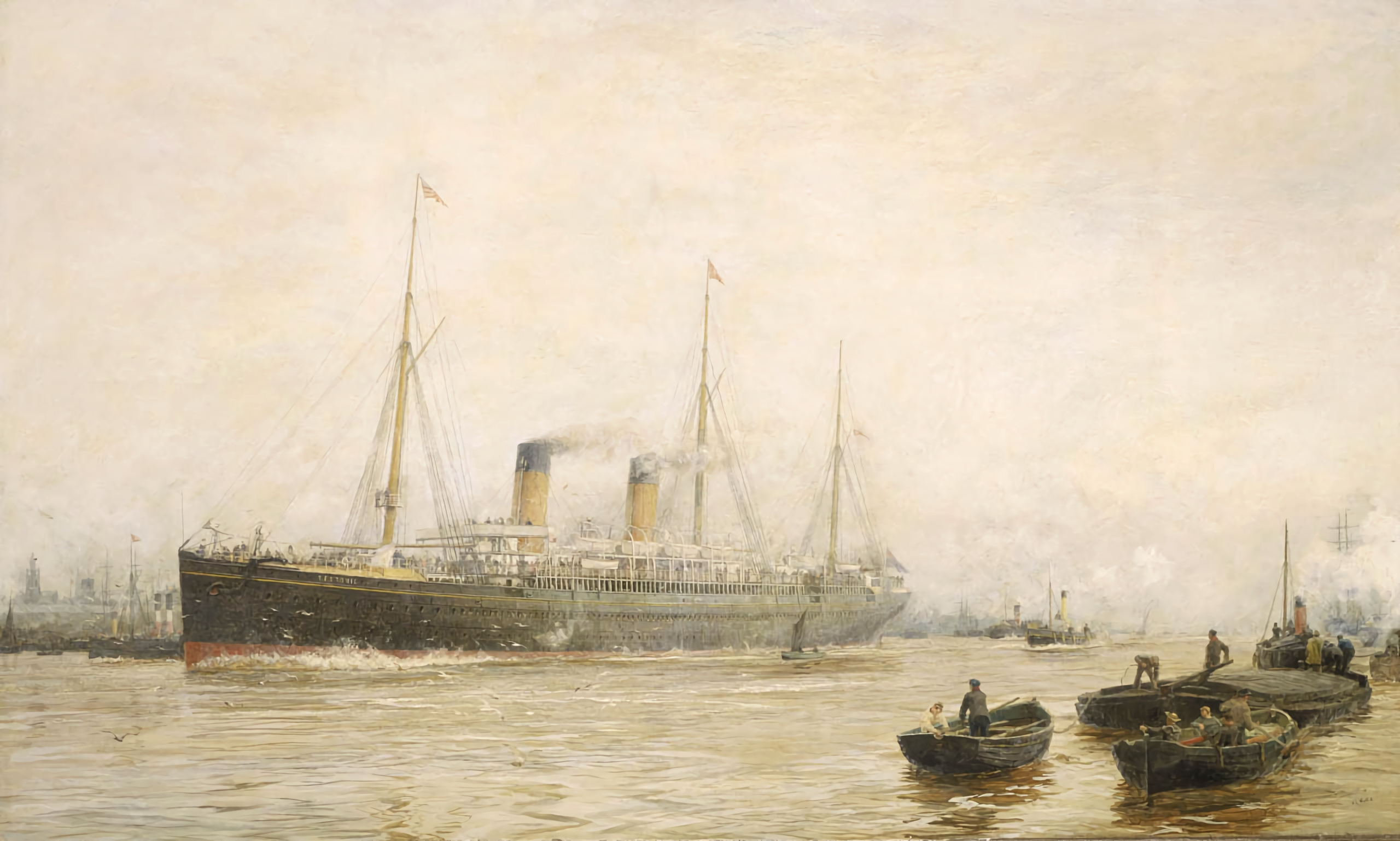
Teutonic Leaving Liverpool (1889) oil on canvas, National Maritime Museum

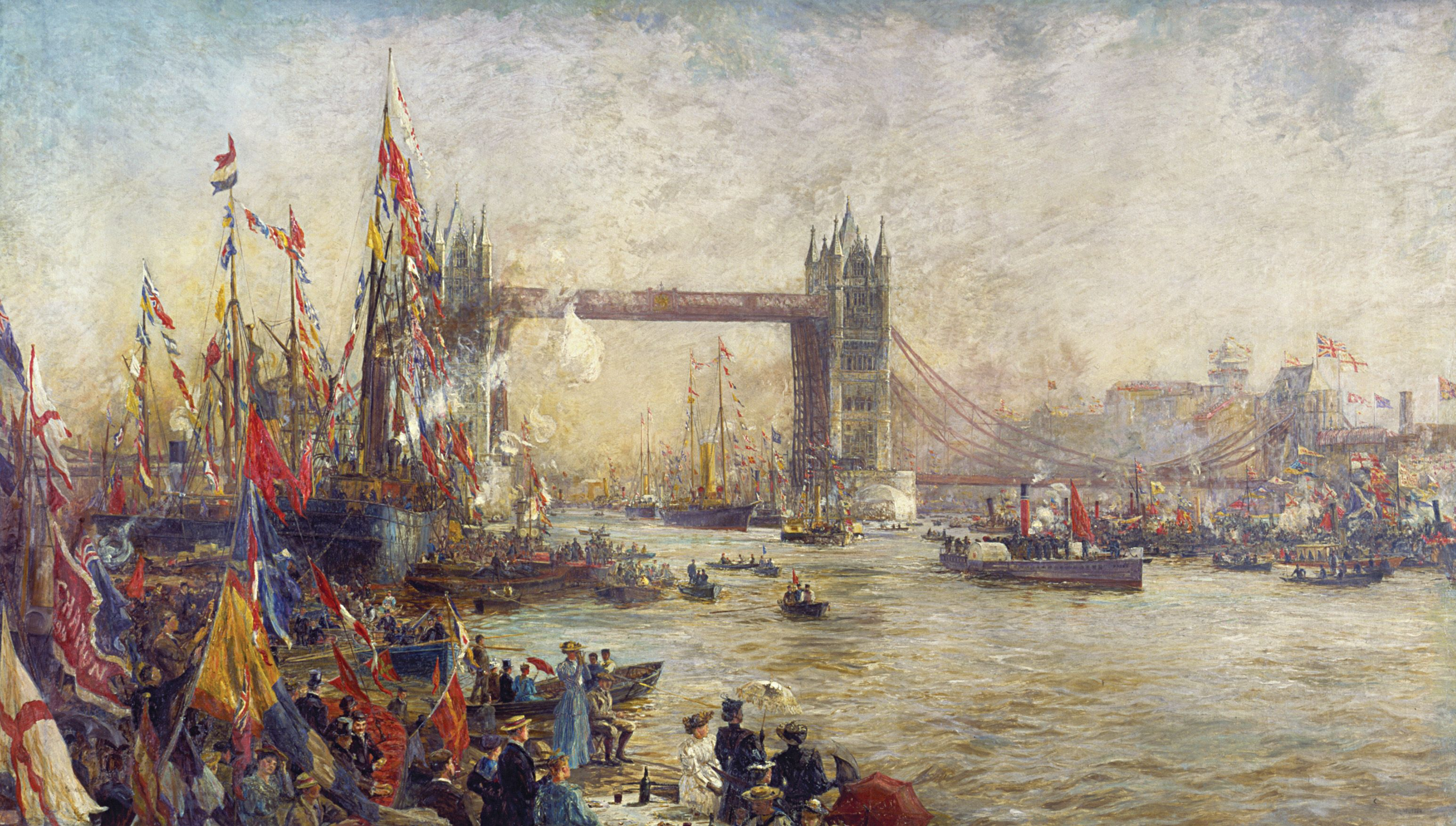
The Opening of Tower Bridge, 1895

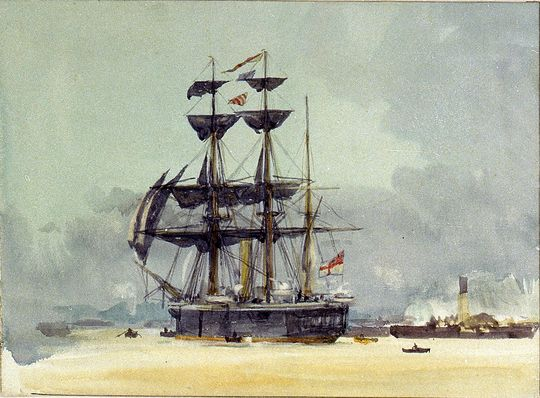
HMS Calypso, 1897

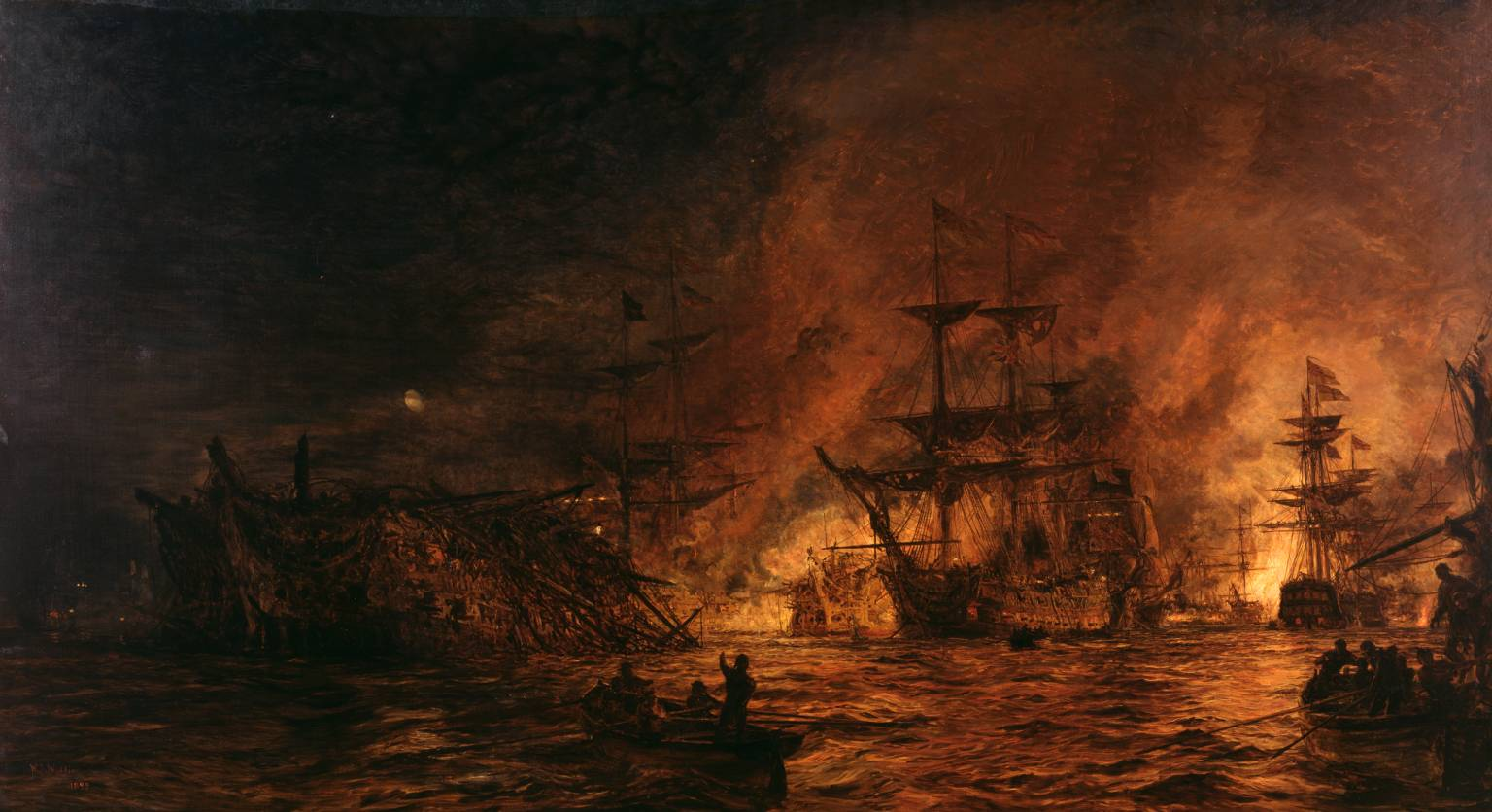
The Battle of the Nile, 1899, Tate, London

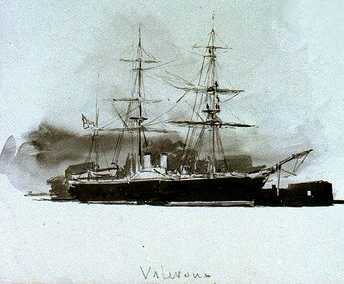
HMS Valorous

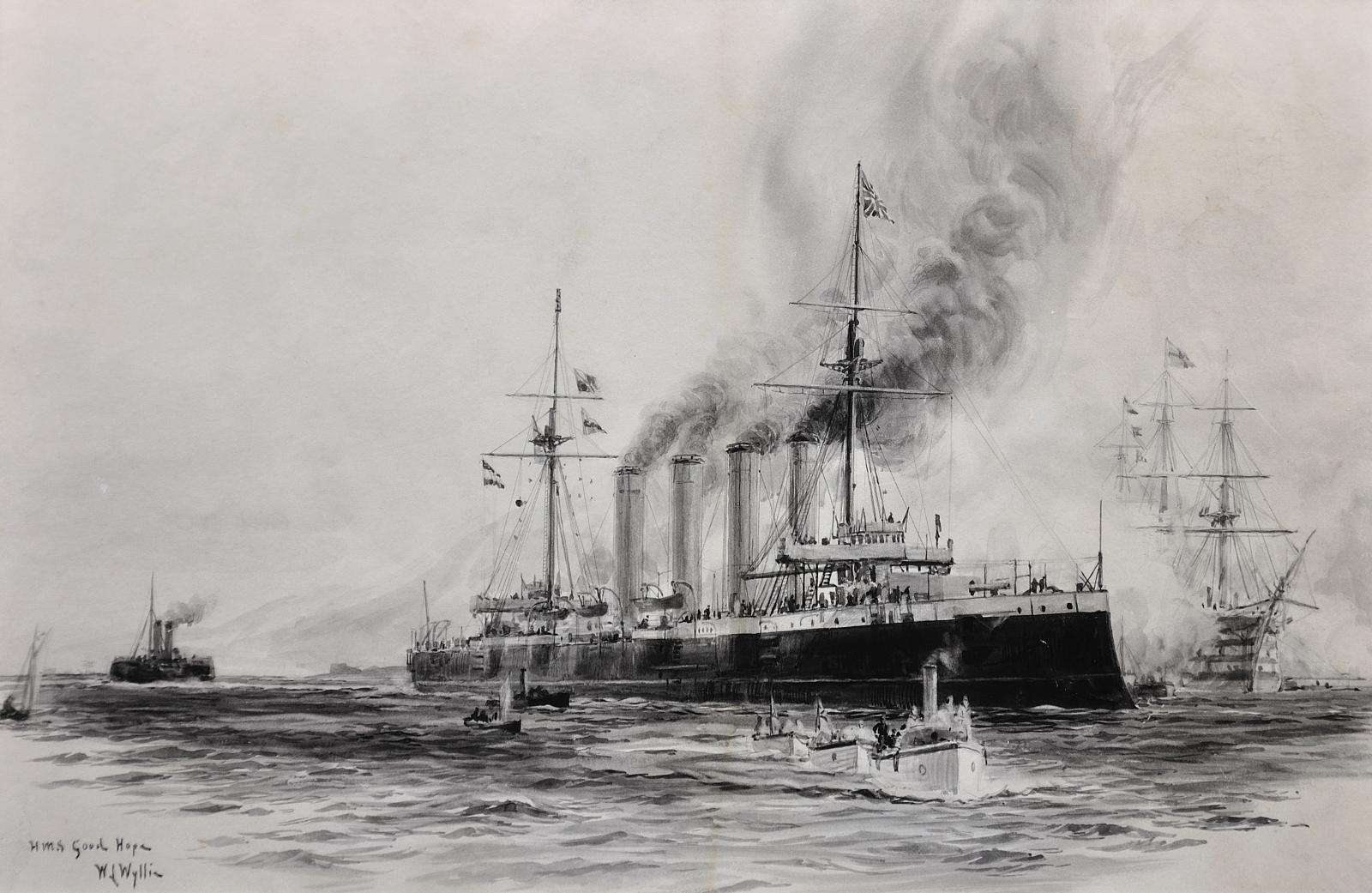
HMS Good Hope

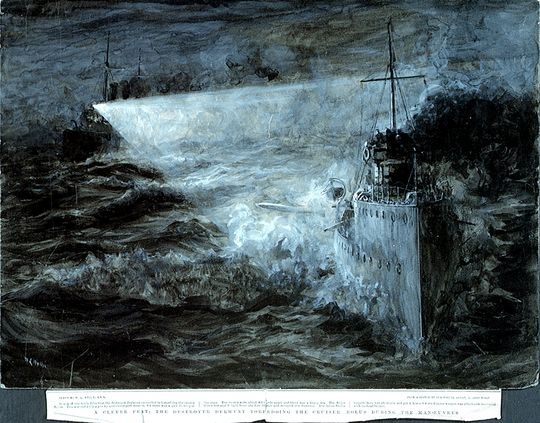
A clever feat: the destroyer HMS Derwent torpedoing the cruiser HMS Aeolus during the manoeuvres 27 August 1904

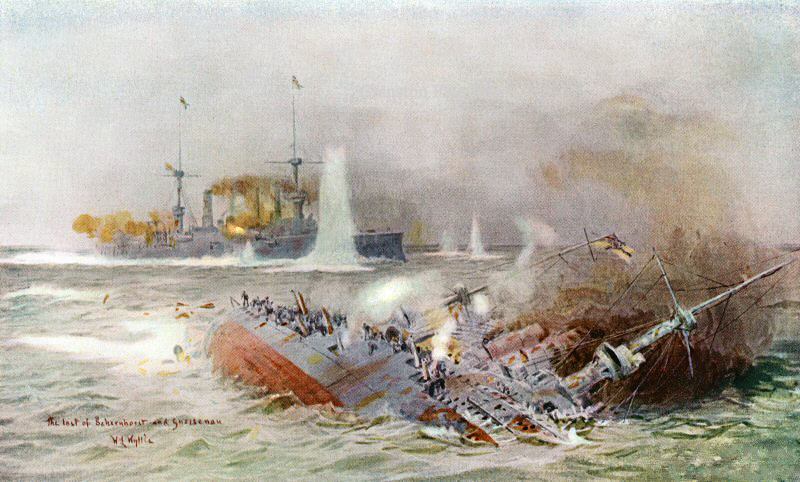
Battle of the Falkland Islands, 1914

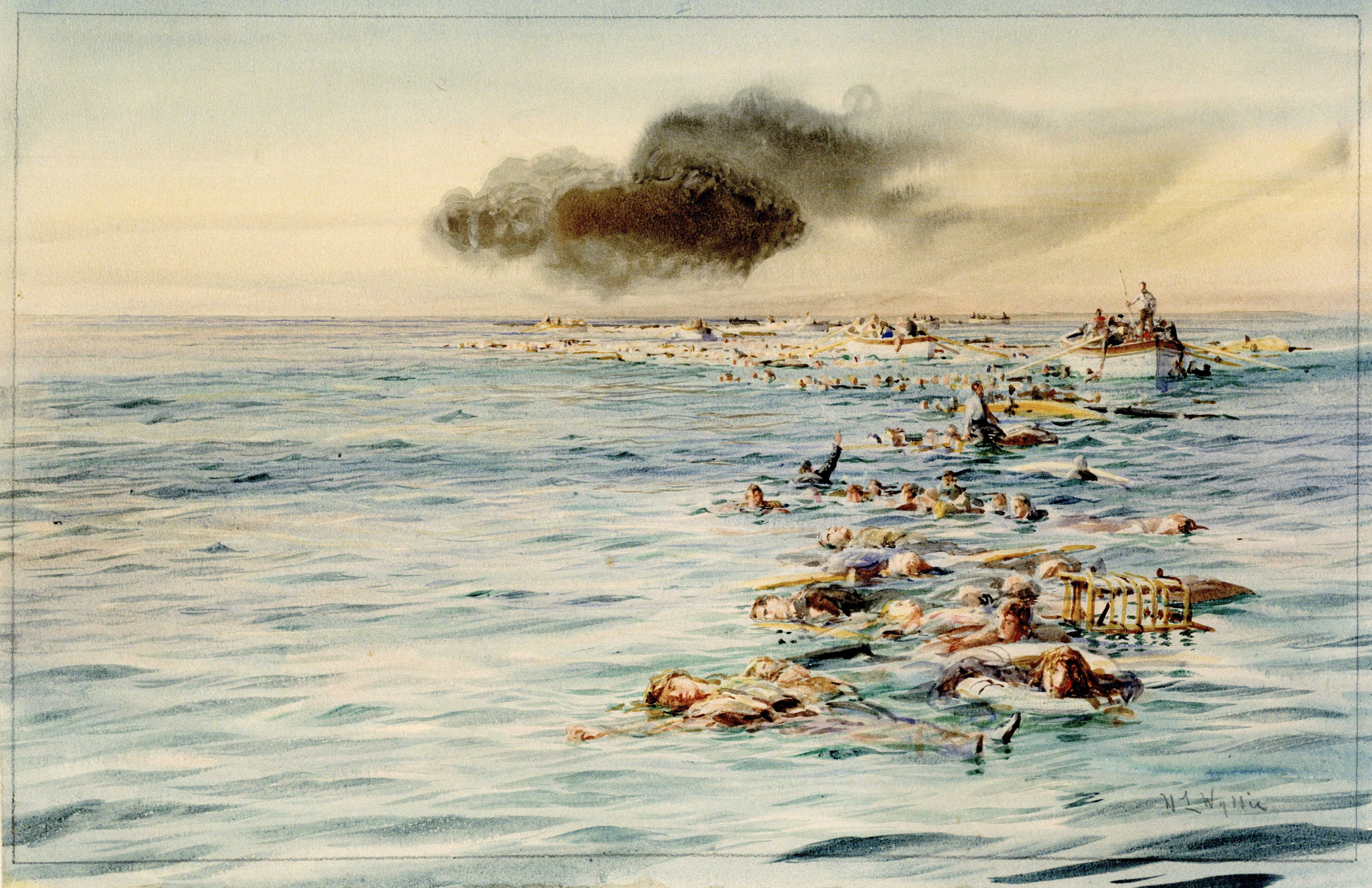
The Track of Lusitania. View of Casualties and Survivors in the Water and in Lifeboats

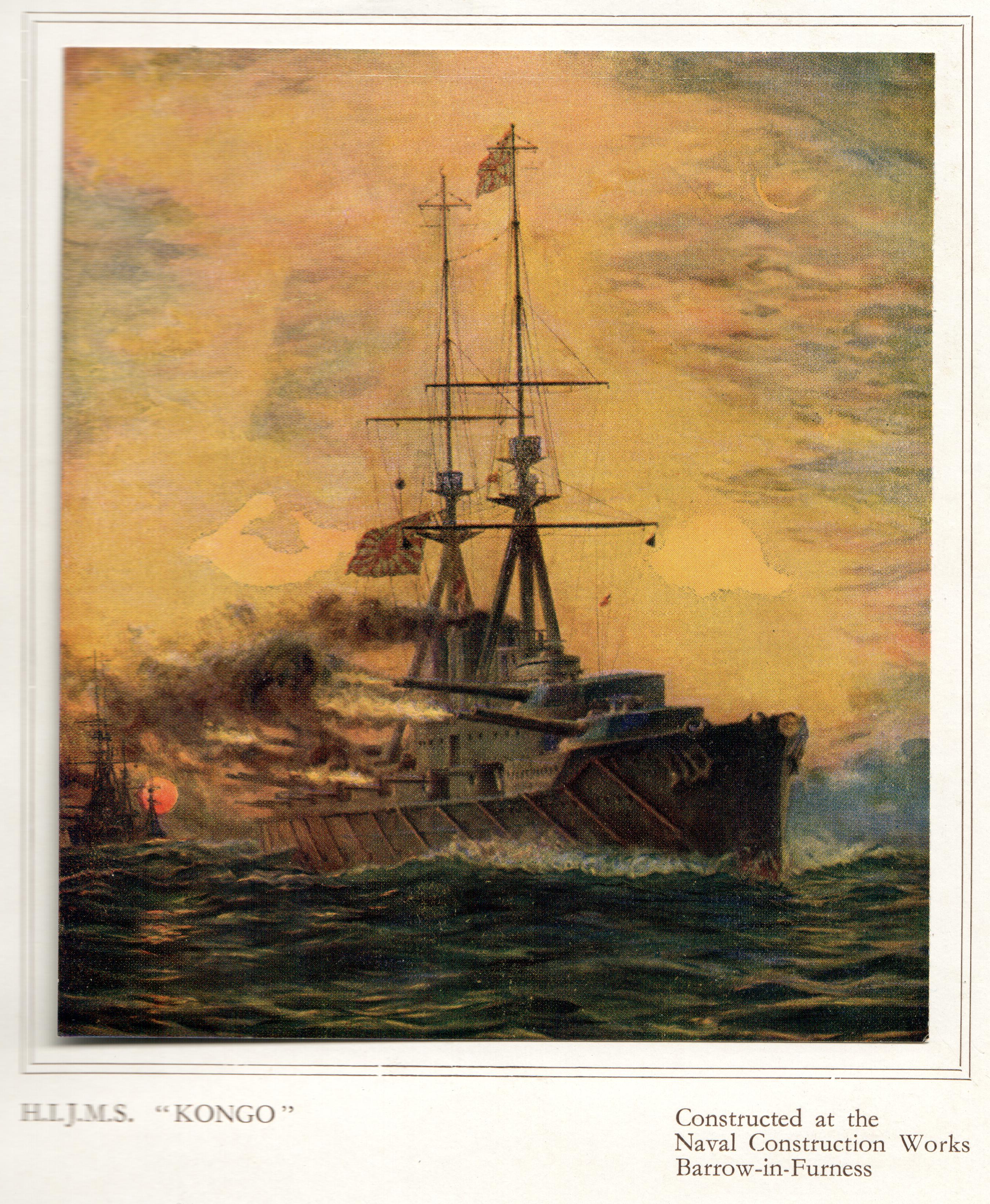
Japanese battlecruiser Kongo as first built

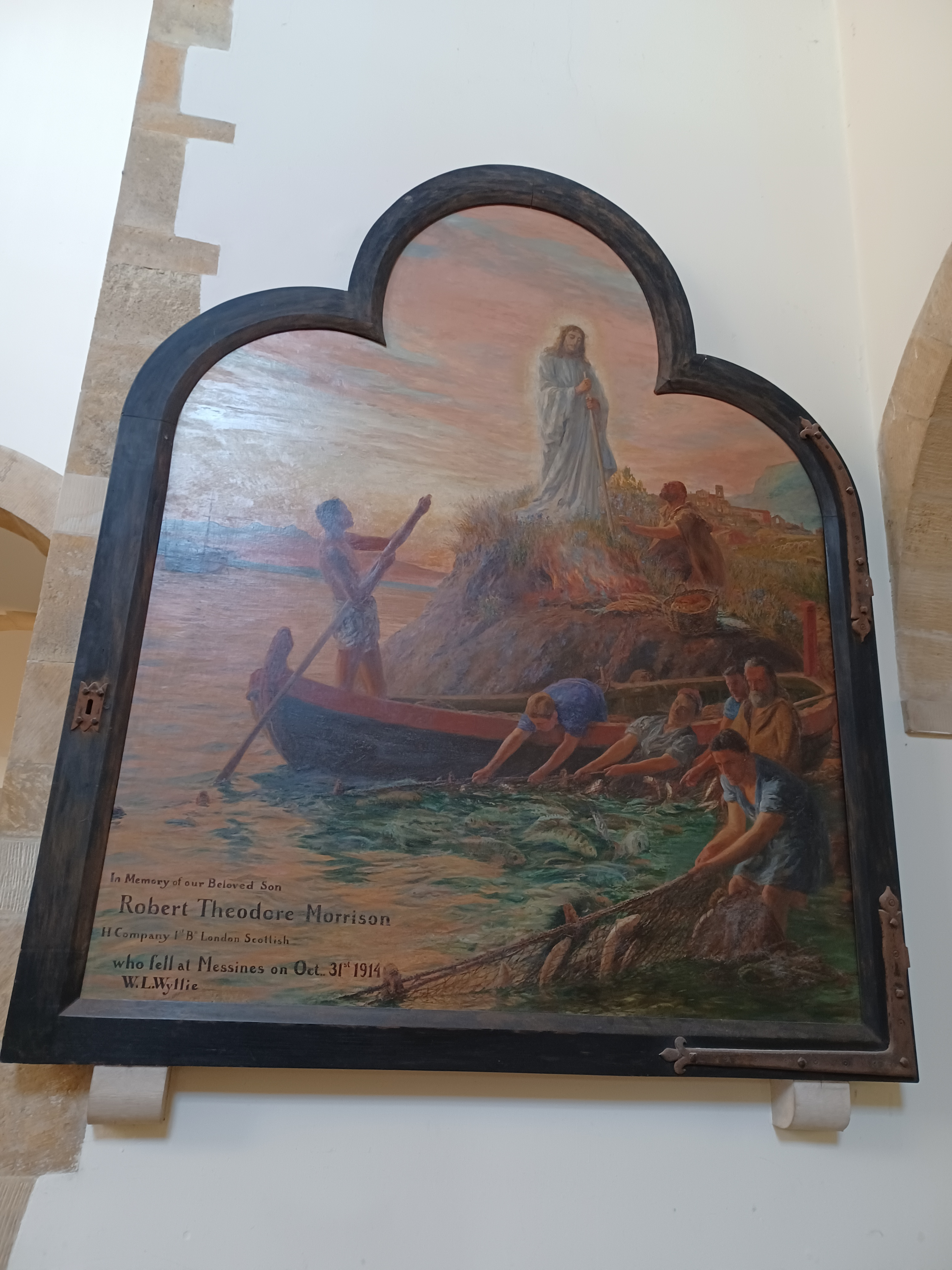
The Miraculous Draught of Fishes, Portsmouth Cathedral. Memorial to Robert Theodore Morrison Wyllie, son of the artist, killed in action on the Western Front, October 31, 1914.

=== Books ===
Written and/or illustrated by Wyllie

- W L Wyllie. Marine Painting in Water-Colour (Cassell and Co., 1901).
- W L Wyllie. Nature's Laws and Making of Pictures (London, 1903)
- W L Wyllie. J. M. W. Turner, (London: George Bell & sons, 1905).
- M A & W L Wyllie. London to the Nore (London, 1905).
- M A Wyllie. Norway and its fjords (London: Methuen & Co, 1907).
- W L Wyllie. Sketchbook (London, 1908).
- Jane, Fred T. The British battle fleet; its inception and growth throughout the centuries to the present day: Volume 1, Volume 2 (London: The Library Press Ltd., 1915).
- W L Wylie & W F Wren. Sea fights of the great war, naval incidents during the first nine months (Cassell & Co., 1918)
- W L Wyllie, Charles Owen, W D Kirkpatrick. More sea fights of the Great War, including the Battle of Jutland (London, Cassell, 1919).
- W L Wyllie. The Old Portsmouth and New Southsea (London: The British Art Company, 1923).
- R M Whitlaw & W L Wyllie. Lionel P Smythe RA RWS London, 1923.
