= HMS Valorous (1851) =

Frigate of the Royal Navy

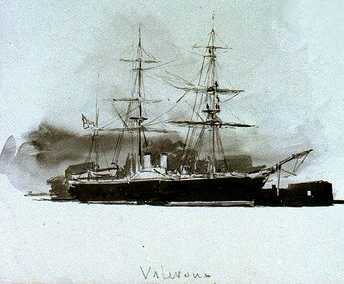
- HMS Valorous, a sketch by W L Wyllie

History

United Kingdom
- Name: Valorous
- Ordered: 25 April 1847
- Builder: Pembroke Dockyard
- Laid down: March 1849
- Launched: 30 April 1851
- Completed: 7 July 1853
- Fate: Sold for scrap, 27 February 1891

General characteristics (as built)
- Class & type: Magicienne-class second-class paddle frigate
- Tons burthen: 1,25669/94 bm
- Length: 210 ft (64 m)
- Beam: 36 ft (11 m)
- Draught: 8 ft 8 in (2.6 m) (deep load)
- Depth of hold: 24 ft 6 in (7.47 m)
- Installed power: 400 nhp, 1,300 ihp (970 kW)
- Propulsion: Paddle wheels; oscillating steam engines
- Speed: 9–10 knots (17–19 km/h; 10–12 mph)
- Complement: 175
- Armament: Gundeck: 10 × 32 pdr guns; Upper deck: 1 × 68-pounder gun, 1 × 10 in (250 mm) gun, 4 × 32 pdr guns

HMS Valorous was one of two 16-gun, steam-powered Magicienne-class second-class paddle frigates built for the Royal Navy in the 1850s. Commissioned in 1853 she played a small role in the Crimean War of 1854–1855 and was sold for scrap in 1891.

== Design and construction ==
The Magicienne-class ships had a length at the gun deck of 210 feet (64 m) and 185 feet 6 inches (56.5 m) at the keel. They had a beam of 36 feet (11 m), and a depth of hold of 24 feet 6 inches (7.5 m). The ships' tonnage was 1,25669/94 tons burthen and they had a draught of 8 feet 8 inches (2.6 m). Their crew numbered 175 officers and ratings.

The ships were fitted with a pair of 2-cylinder oscillating steam engines, rated at 400 nominal horsepower, that drove their paddlewheels. The engines produced 1,300 indicated horsepower (970 kW) in service that gave them speeds of 9–10 knots (17–19 km/h; 10–12 mph). The ships were armed with eight 32-pounder (56 cwt) (Note: "Cwt" is the abbreviation for hundredweight, 56 cwt referring to the weight of the gun.) cannon on the gundeck. On the upper deck were one each 68-pounder (95 cwt) and a 10-inch (254 mm) (85 cwt) shell guns as well as four more 32-pounders.

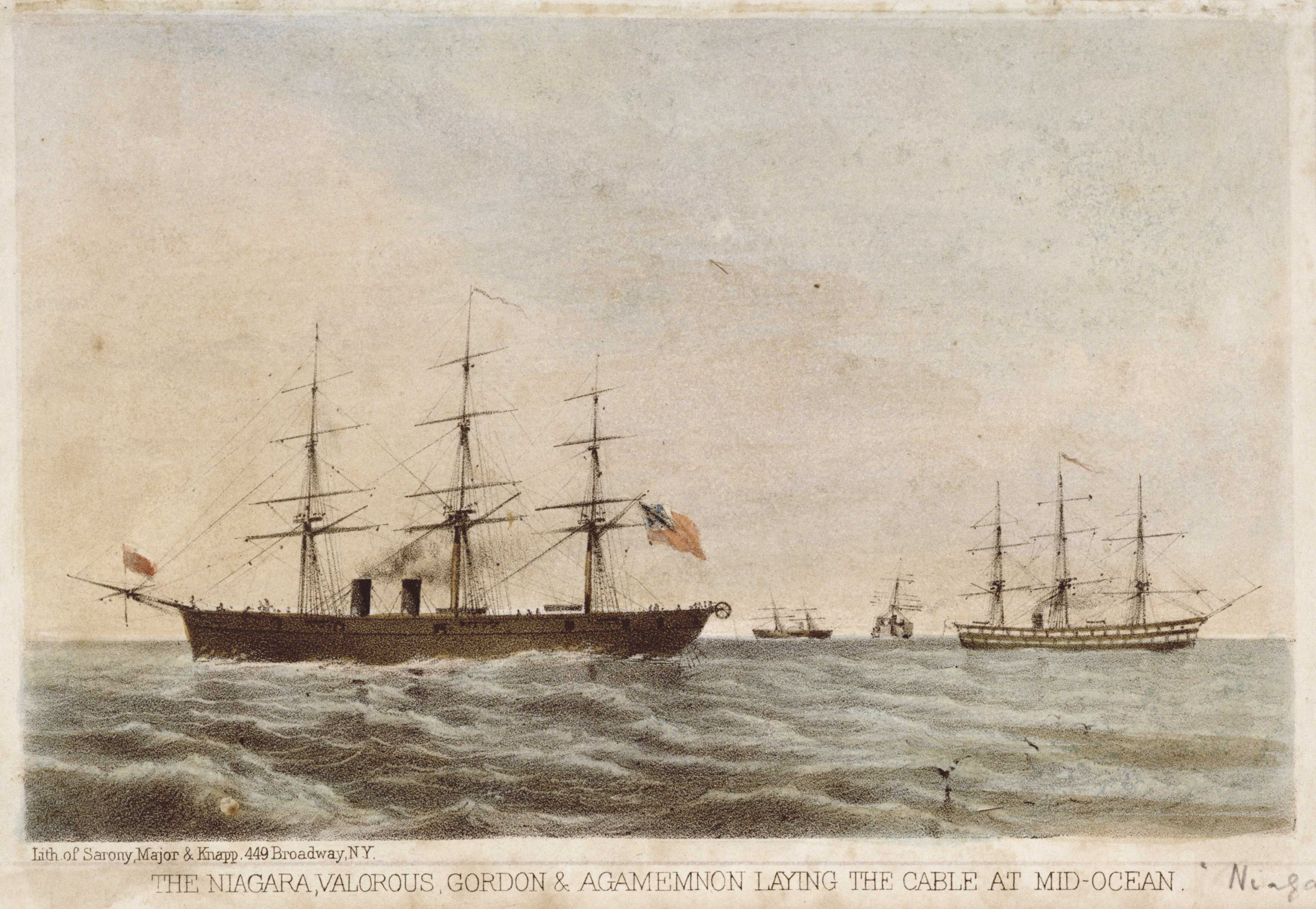
Niagara, Valorous, Gorgon (misspelt Gordon) and Agamemnon laying the Transatlantic telegraph cable at mid-ocean in 1858

Valorous was built at a cost of £69,064, of which her machinery cost £24,329. She was originally ordered on 25 April 1847 as a first-class sloop to John Edye's design, approved on 12 August 1847. On 5 August they were re-ordered as 210 ft (64 m) vessels. When finished, they constituted the last group of paddle warships built for the Royal Navy.

== Career ==
In 1852 she was in the Mediterranean Sea, then in 1854 she was assigned to the Baltic Sea. On 23 July, Valorous ran aground off Åland, Grand Duchy of Finland. She was severely damaged, losing her forefoot and keel and being holed. A sail was placed over the hole and her crew managed to prevent her from sinking. In 1855 she operated in the Black Sea during the Crimean War. In 1857 she was on the North America and West Indies Station, and from 1863 until she was paid off in September 1867 she operated off the Cape of Good Hope. On 10 January 1871, she was driven from her moorings and ran aground at Plymouth, Devon. Damage was described as slight. Carrying extra stores, she accompanied the British Arctic Expedition ships Alert and Discovery as far as Qeqertarsuaq, Godhavn in 1875. On 27 July, Valorous ran aground 10 nautical miles (19 km) off Holstenborg, Greenland. She was refloated and found to be leaky. She was taken in to Holstenborg for repairs, which took ten days. A watertight bulkhead was inserted at the bow as part of the repairs. In 1878 she was commanded by Captain John A Fisher (later Admiral of the Fleet).

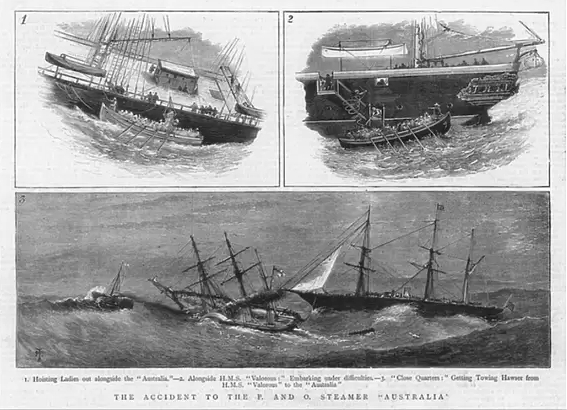
The accident to the P&O Steamer Australia, where Valourous came to assist. The Graphic 1879

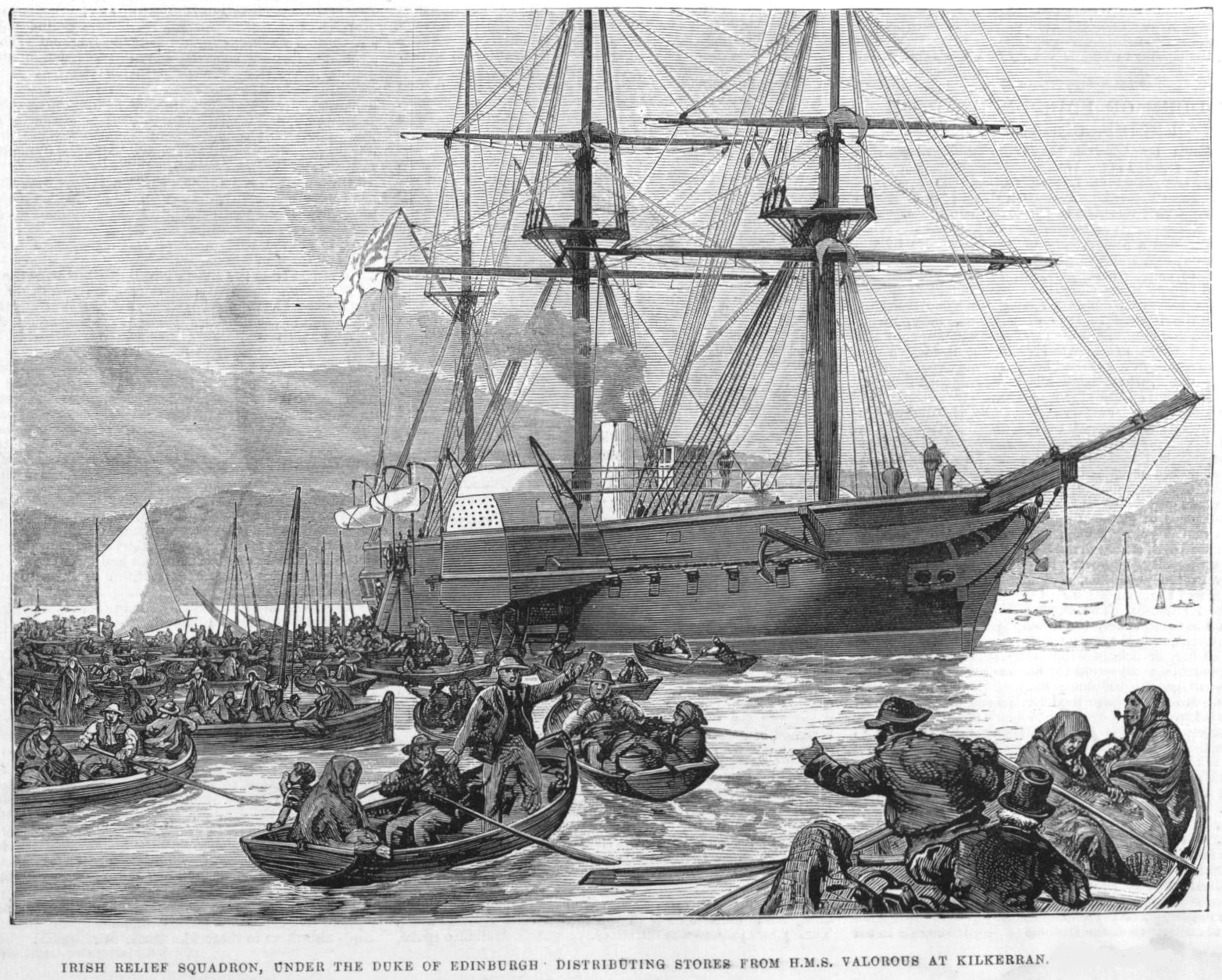
The Irish Relief Squadron, under the Duke of Edinburgh, Valorous distributing stores at Killerran. Illustrated London News 1880

== Disposal ==
She was sold on 27 February 1891 to E Marshall of Plymouth for breaking up.
