= Minnie Smythe =

British painter (1872–1955)

Minnie Smythe RWS
- Born: 1872; St Pancras, London
- Died: 1955 (aged 82–83); St Pancras, London
- Known for: Watercolour
- Father: Lionel Smythe

Minnie Smythe RWS (1872–1955) was a British landscape watercolourist. Her paintings often depicted the figures and countryside of the Pas-de-Calais region of France.

== Biography ==
Smythe was born in 1872 at St Pancras, London. She was the daughter of the artist Lionel Smythe and Alice Gunyon, the second of three children. Educated in France, she was trained in painting by her father. Smythe had her first exhibition in 1896 at the Royal Academy while she was living at the family home of Chateau d'Honvault, near Wimereux in Pas-de-Calais, France. In 1897, she had her first pupil as a painting teacher, the architect Sydney Vacher. In 1901, she exhibited at the Society of Women Artists, the same year she was made an Associate of the Royal Watercolour Society. In 1904, it was noted by the Fine Art Society in London that her production was sparing, and her subjects were mainly of figures and landscapes from the Pas-de-Calais region. She also painted flowers and received commissions for child portraits. In 1905, her work A Cottage Girl was included in the book Women Painters of the World. After the death of their father in 1918, Smythe moved with her brother from France to London. She became a full member of the Royal Watercolour Society in 1937, where she exhibited 61 works. She also showed 21 paintings in total at the Royal Academy. Her last exhibition was in 1939. Smythe died in 1955 in St. Pancras, London.

The collection of the Royal Watercolour Society includes a work by Smythe entitled Gorse. In 1997, one of her watercolours sold at Christie's for US$2,300. She signed her works with an MS monogram, or alternatively as M. Smythe and Minnie Smythe.

== Exhibitions ==
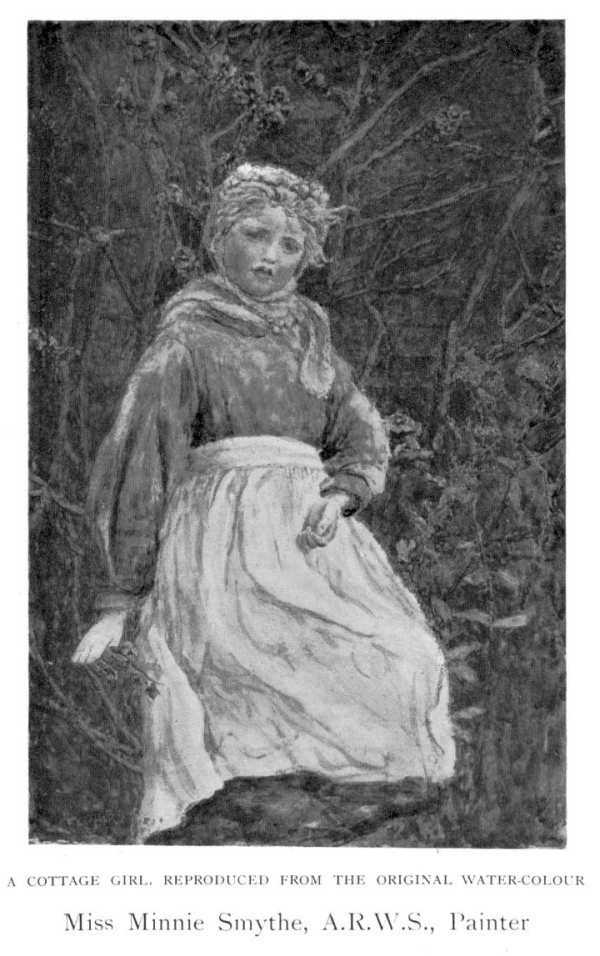
A Cottage Girl, from Women Painters of the World, 1905.

- Fine Art Society, 1 work
- Walker Art Gallery, Liverpool, 11 works
- Leicester Galleries, 2 works
- Manchester Art Gallery, 2 works
- Royal Academy of Arts, 21 works
- Royal Hibernian Academy, 2 works
- Royal Scottish Society of Painters in Watercolour, 1 work
- Royal Watercolour Society, 61 works
- Society of Women Artists, 1 work
