= Wimereux =

Wimereux Wimeruwe (West Flemish)
- Commune
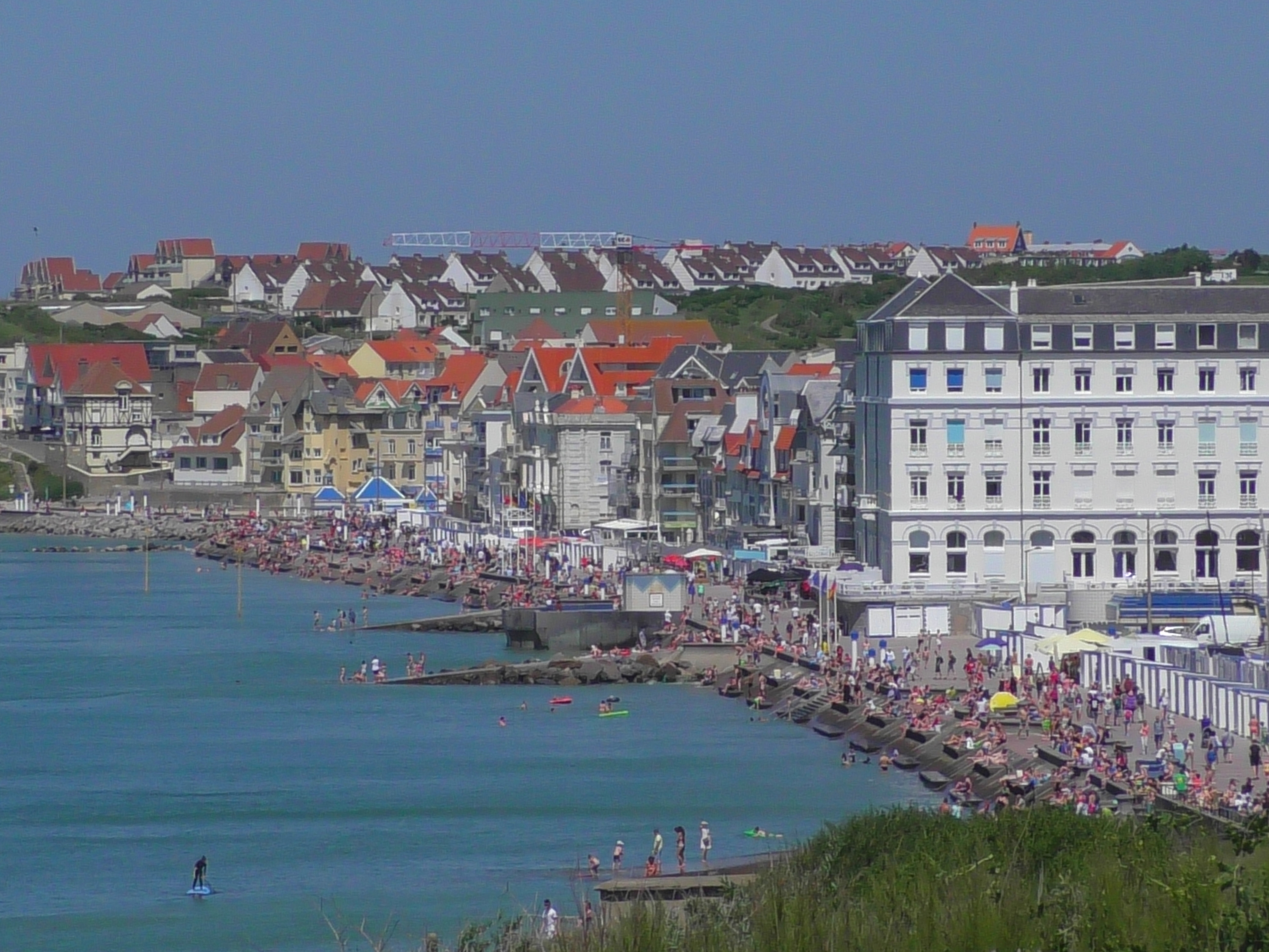
- Wimereux

- Coat of arms
- Location of Wimereux
- Location within France Location within Hauts-de-France
- Coordinates: 50.77°N 1.61°E
- Country: France
- Region: Hauts-de-France
- Department: Pas-de-Calais
- Arrondissement: Boulogne-sur-Mer
- Canton: Boulogne-sur-Mer-1
- Intercommunality: Boulonnais

Government
  - Mayor (2020–2026): Jean-Luc Dubaële
- Area^{1}: 7.71 km^{2} (2.98 sq mi)
- Highest elevation: 71 m (233 ft)
- Lowest elevation: 0 m (0 ft)
- Population (2023): 6,256
  - Density: 811/km^{2} (2,100/sq mi)
- Time zone: UTC+01:00 (CET)
  - Summer (DST): UTC+02:00 (CEST)
- INSEE/Postal code: 62893 /62930
- ^{1} French Land Register data, which excludes lakes, ponds, glaciers > 1 km^{2} (0.386 sq mi or 247 acres) and river estuaries.

Wimereux (French: [vim(ə)ʁø]; West Flemish: Wimeruwe) is a commune in the Pas-de-Calais department in the Hauts-de-France region of France 5 kilometres (3 mi) north of Boulogne-sur-Mer, on the banks of the small river Wimereux. The river Slack forms the northern border of the commune and the English Channel the western.

== History ==
In March 1899 the first radio link between France and England was established at Wimereux by Guglielmo Marconi.

During the First World War a number of hospitals were created at Wimereux:

- The Women's Hospital Corps (WHC), founded by Flora Murray and Louisa Garratt Anderson, opened its second hospital at Chateau Mauricien in Wimereux. WHC was the first women's hospital to be recognised by the British Army.
- Lady Hadfield set up and ran the 'Anglo-American' Red Cross hospital in Wimereux under the Anglo-French Hospitals committee of the British Red Cross; the Matron was Mrs De Winton.
- 'The British Hospital' was established by Sir Henry Norman and his wife Priscilla Norman who became the Lady Superintendent of the hospital, which had 102 beds and was at the Hotel Belle Vue, Wimereux. Dr Grey was in charge of the hospital supported by Matron Mary Foster-Elliot.
- The 'Australian Hospital' was on the sea front. Colonel Eames was the Commanding Officer, and the Matron was Miss Ida Greaves; it had an x-ray department and a high number of ambulances - about thirty.

In 1916, Solomon J Solomon set up a Royal Engineers establishment, the Special Works Park, in a disused feldspar factory and developed new military camouflage techniques and equipment for the British Army.

== People ==
- William Morrison Wyllie, English artist
- Lionel Percy Smythe (Wyllie's stepson), English landscape artist, lived there from 1879 to 1918
- Alfred Mathieu Giard, director of the marine research establishment at Wimereux
- Alexandre Acloque (1871-1941), naturalist and scientific journalist, lived there before 1914.
- John McCrae, author of "In Flanders Fields", is buried in the CWGC cemetery
- Rosalie Lowie (1969-), author of detective novels, lives in Wimereux
- Jack Lang, politician
- Maurice Boitel, artist, exhibited there in the 1980s and 1990s

== Twin towns ==
Wimereux is twinned with the following towns:

- Herne Bay, Kent, England
- Schmallenberg, Germany

== Population ==
Historical population
Year	Pop.	±% p.a.
1968	5,241	—
1975	6,712	+3.60%
1982	7,023	+0.65%
1990	7,109	+0.15%
1999	7,493	+0.59%
2007	7,398	−0.16%
2012	7,161	−0.65%
2017	6,575	−1.69%
2023	6,256	−0.83%
Source: INSEE

== Gallery ==
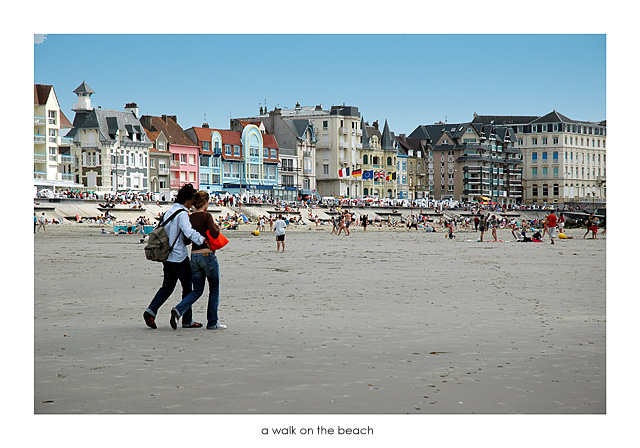
The beach at Wimereux

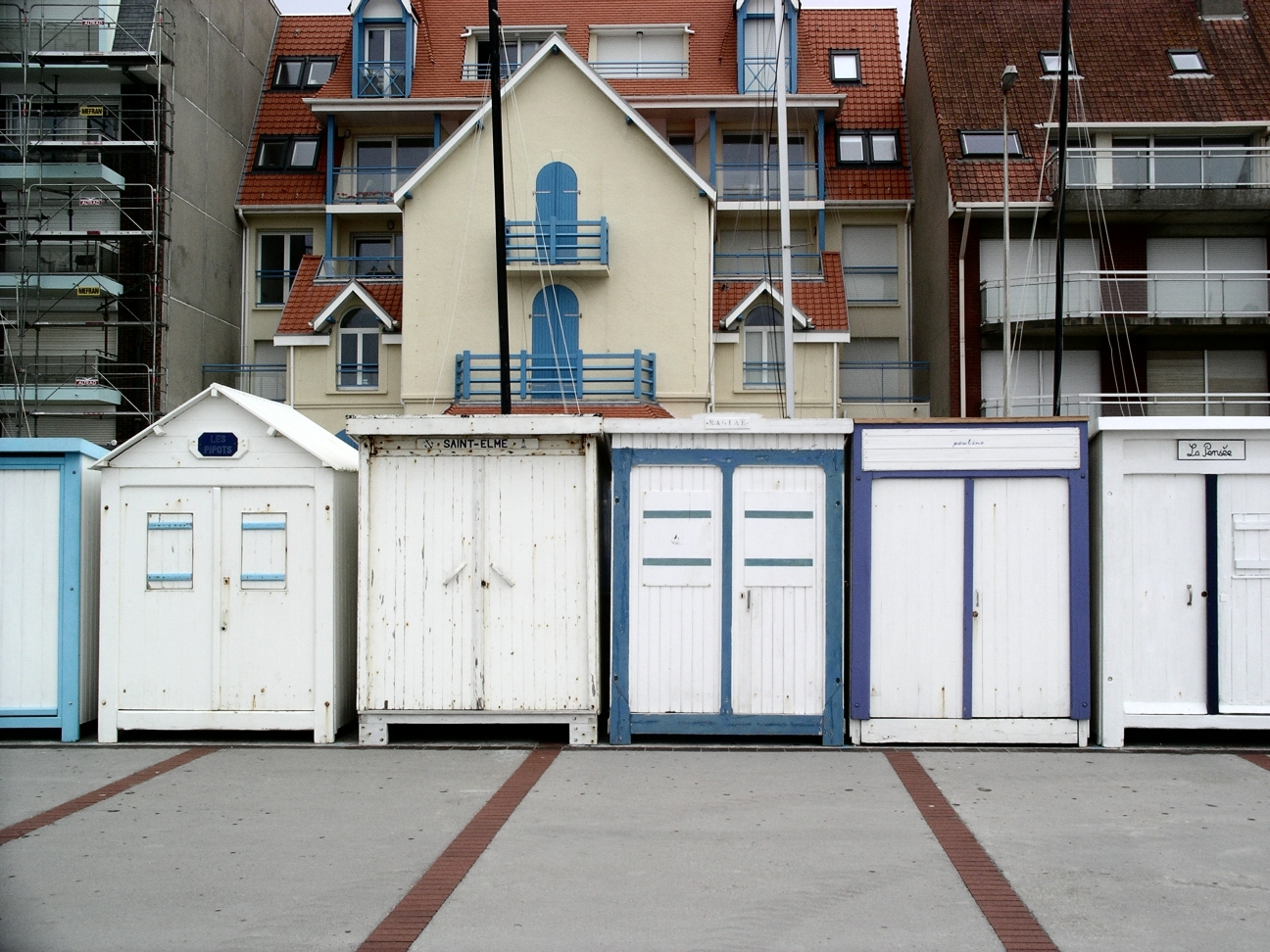
Beach huts

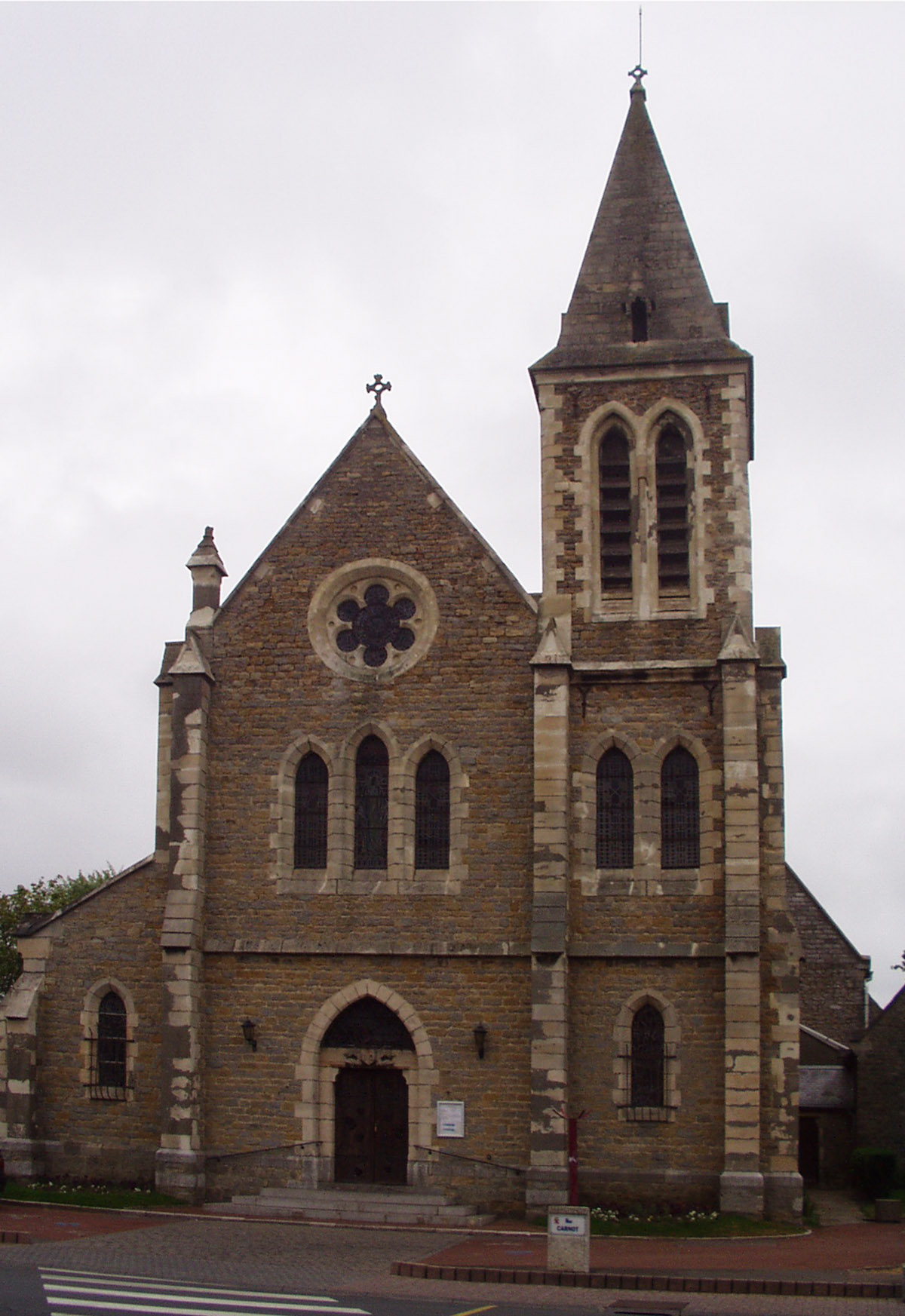
The west front of the church

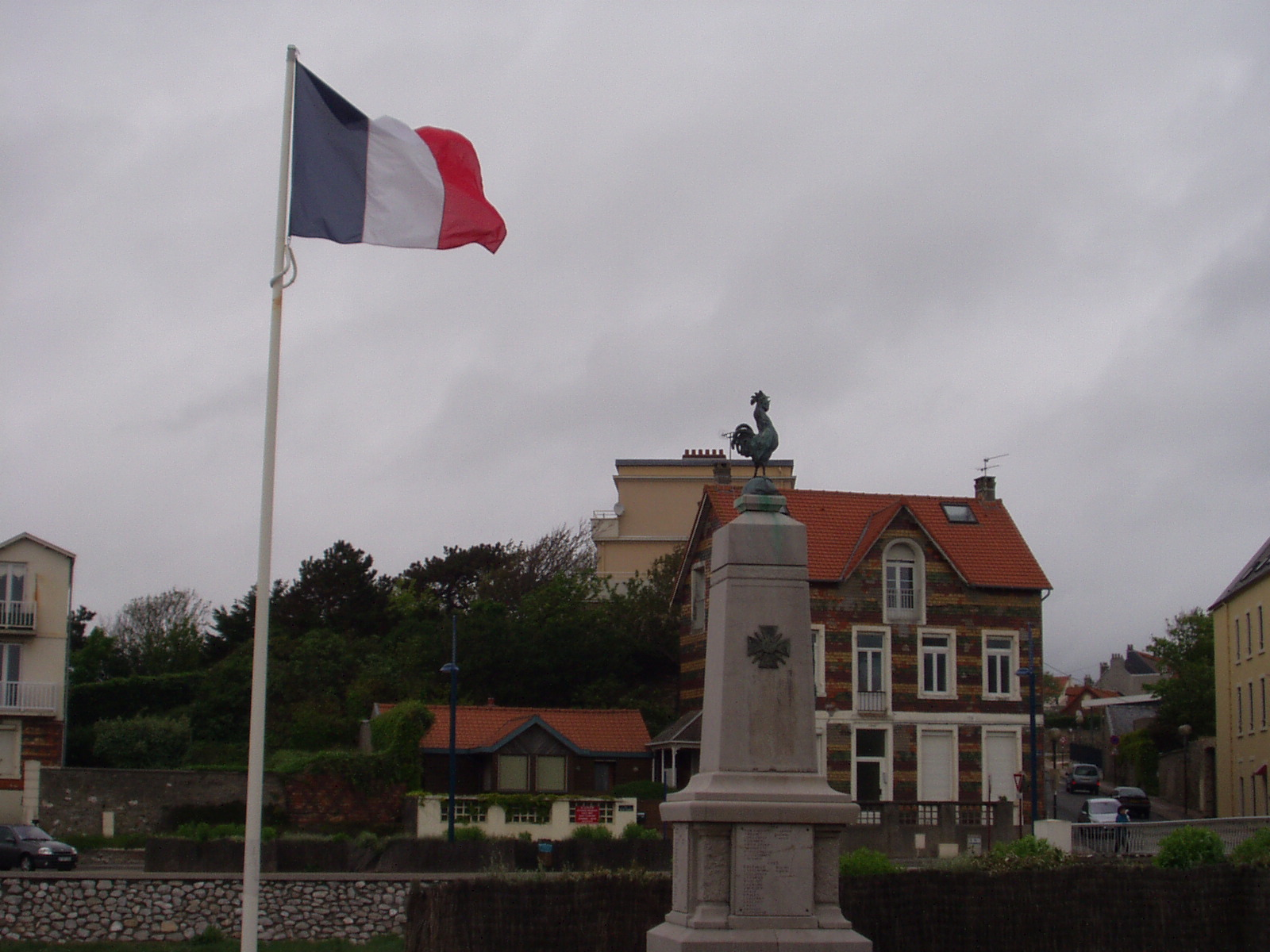
The war memorial

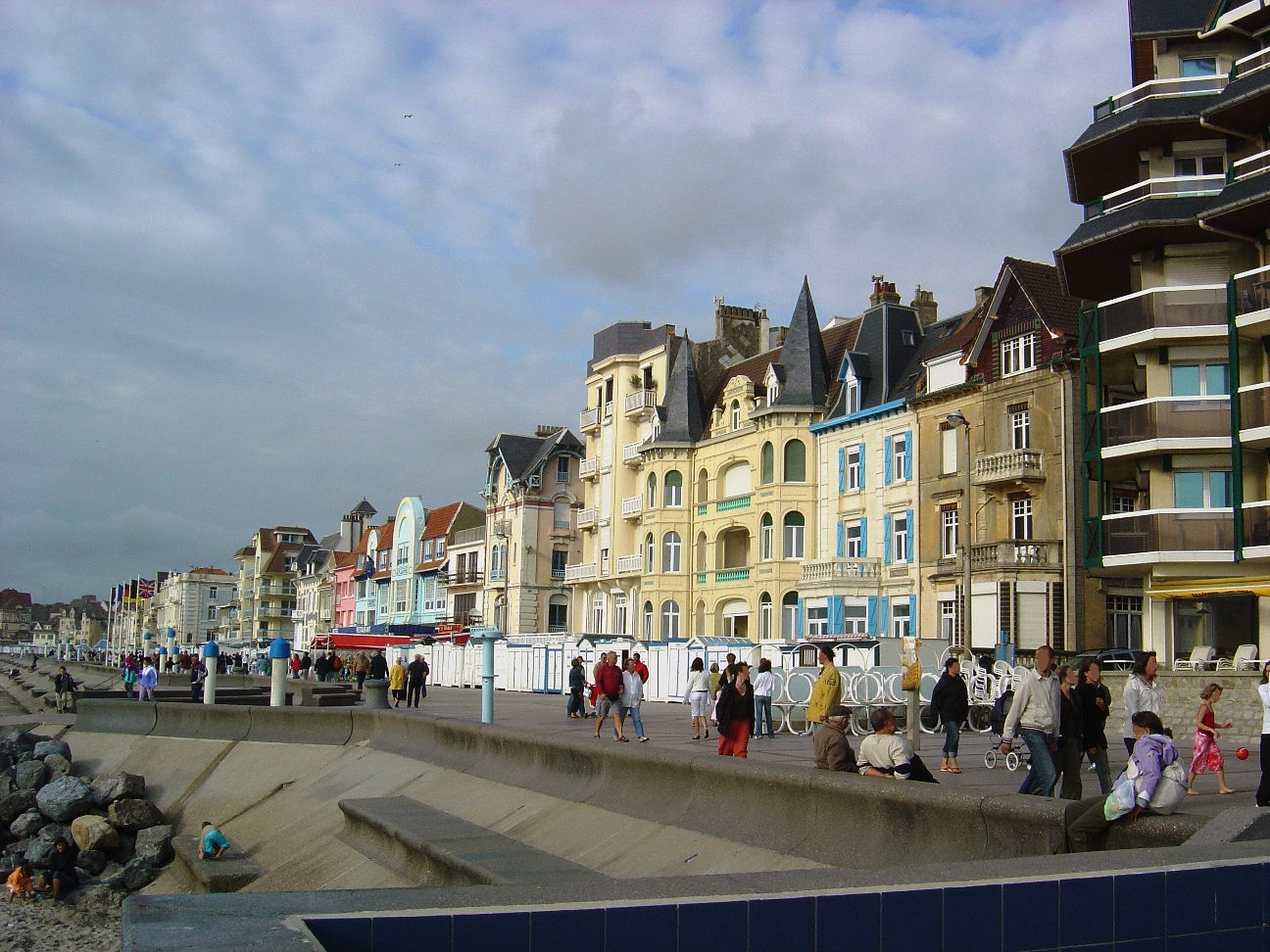
The seafront promenade

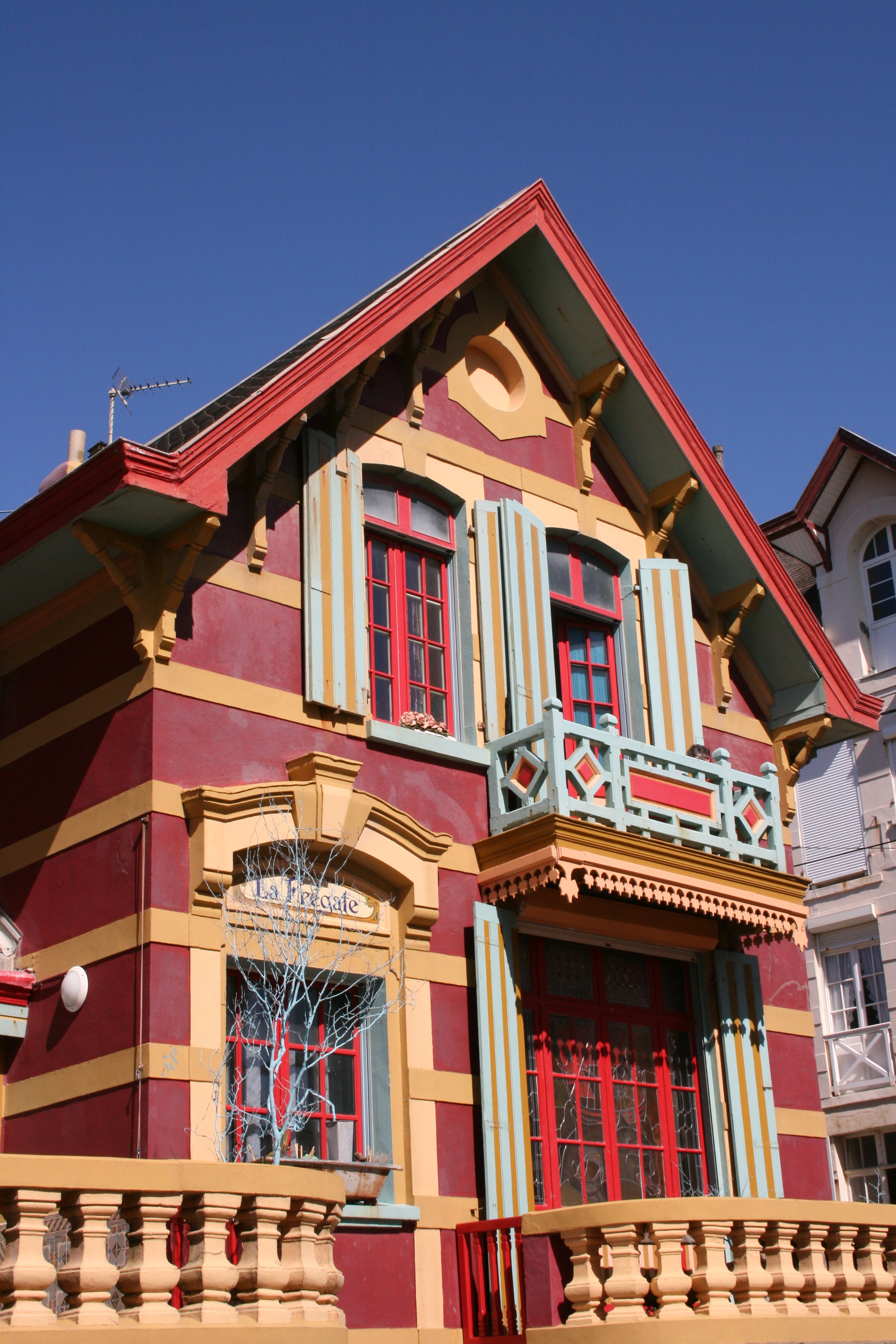
Villa «La Frégate»

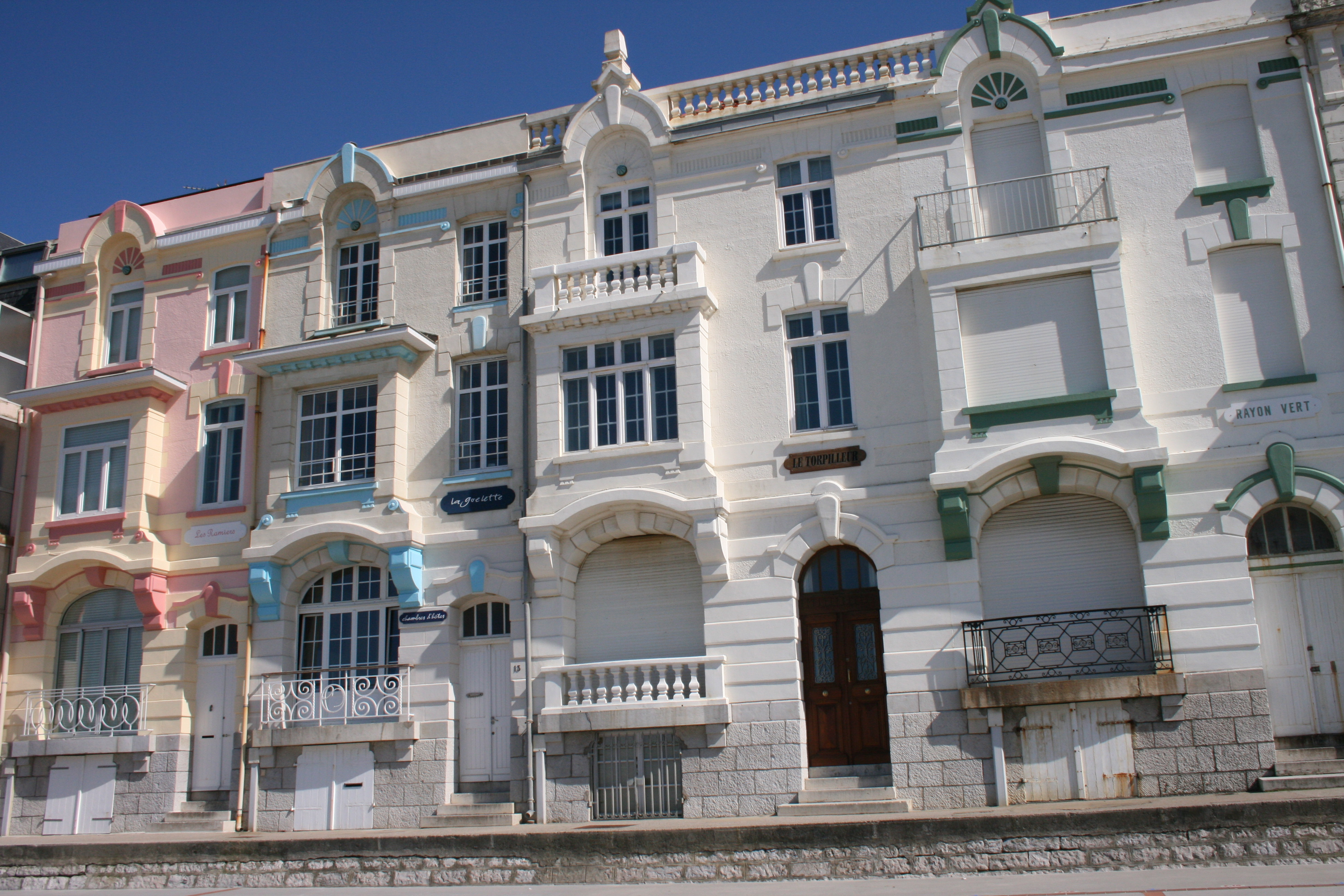
Villas on the seafront

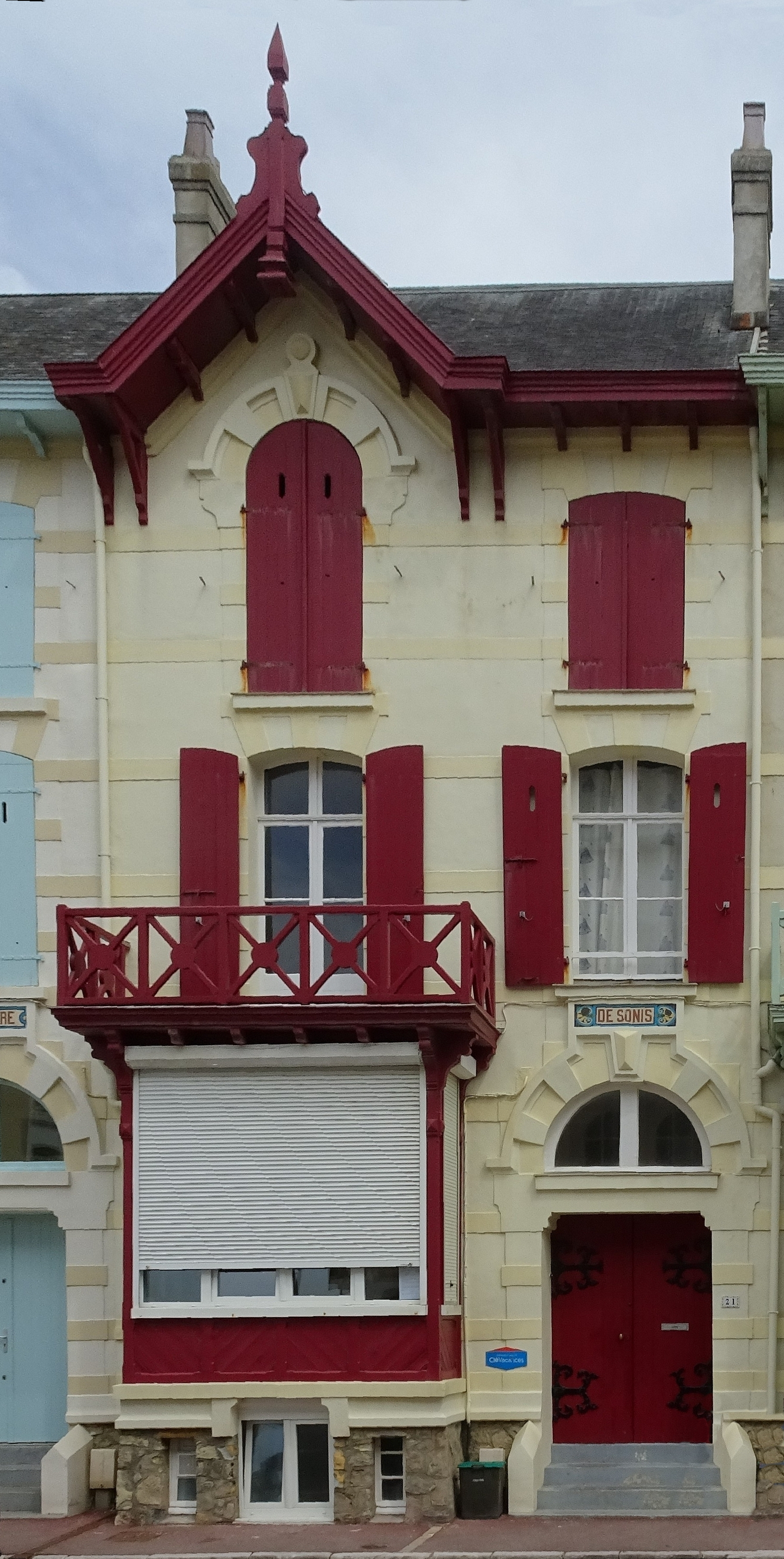
Villa «De Sonis»

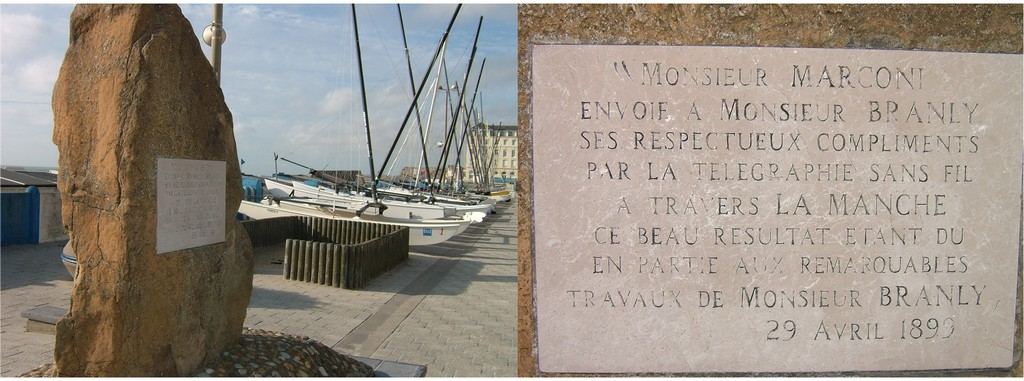
Plaque commemorating Wireless link-up between France and England

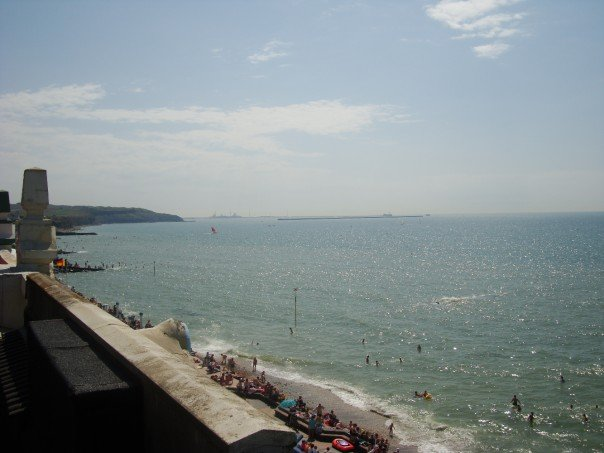
High tide along the beachfront

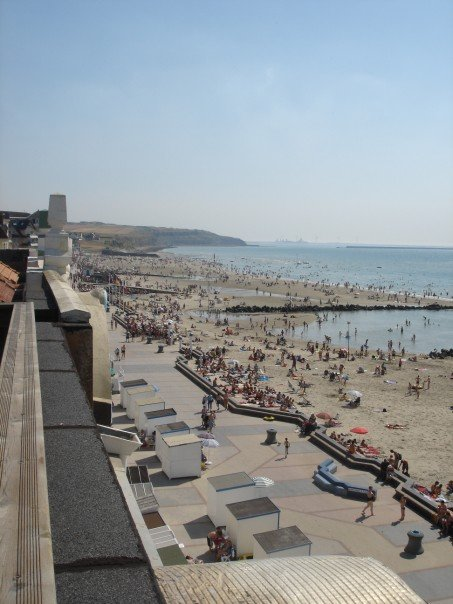
The beach crowded with people at lower tide

== See also ==
- Communes of the Pas-de-Calais department
