= Charles William Wyllie =

English painter

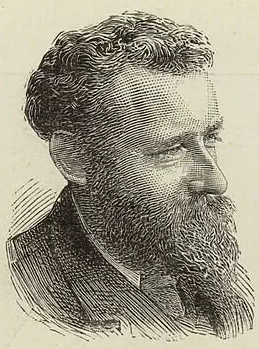
- 1890 Portrait of Charles William Wyllie
- Born: 18 February 1853; London, England
- Died: 28 July 1923 (aged 70); London, England
- Known for: Painting

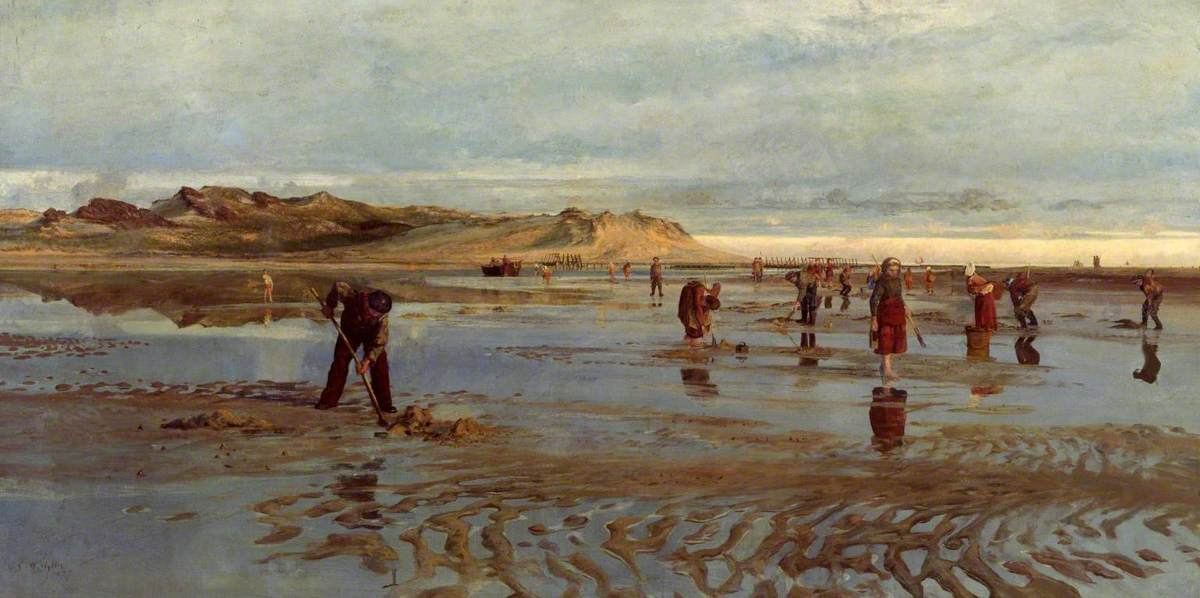
Digging for Bait (1877) by Charles William Wyllie

Charles William Wyllie (18 February 1853 – 28 July 1923) was an English painter. He is best known for painting coastal scenes. Charles was the son of William Morrison Wyllie and younger brother to William Lionel Wyllie.

== Biography ==
Charles William Wyllie was born in London in 1853. His training would involve studying at the Leigh's School of Art and the Royal Academy Schools. He would paint coastal scenes, and produce many paintings of the Thames, as well as illustrating for The Graphic.

Wyllie was a member of the Society of British Artists and the Institute of Painters in Oil Colours. His works would be exhibited in various galleries in London including at the Royal Academy and Suffolk Street. He would receive a bronze medal in 1899 for his participation in the Exposition Universelle of 1889 as well as receiving an honourable mention in 1900.
