= Harold Wyllie =

English painter and lieutenant colonel

Harold Wyllie OBE
- Born: 29 June 1880; London, England
- Died: 22 December 1973 (aged 93); London, England
- Known for: Maritime painting

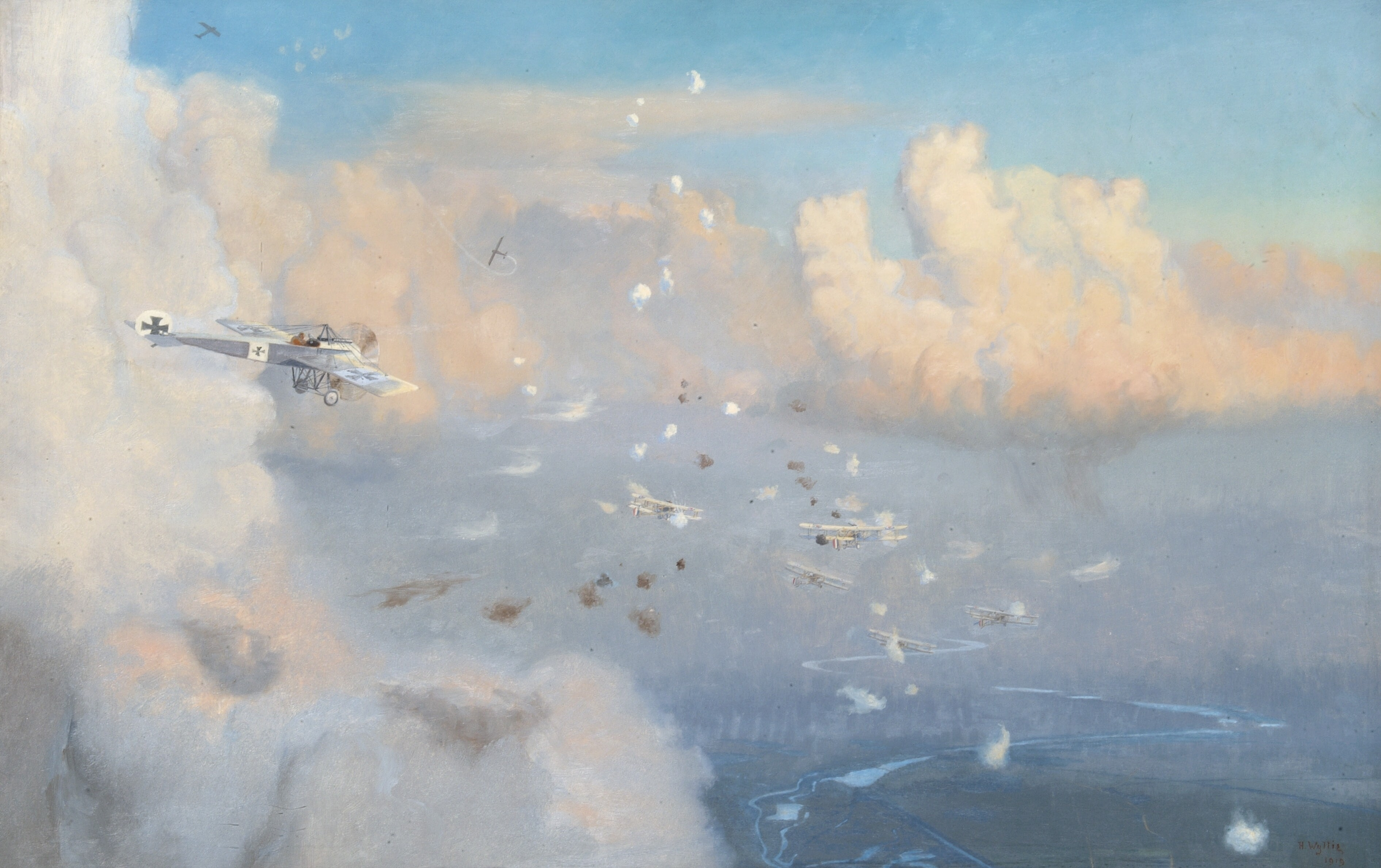
Army Reconnaissance by Harold Wyllie (1919)

Harold Wyllie OBE (29 June 1880 – 22 December 1973) was an English painter and lieutenant-colonel. He is known for his paintings of maritime scenes.

== Biography ==
Harold was born to William Lionel Wyllie, who was also a painter and similarly worked in maritime art, under whom he trained.

=== Military career ===
Wyllie served in the British army during the Boer War. He would serve as a pilot under the Royal Flying Corps during the First World War and would in 1916 transfer to the Wiltshire Regiment. Wyllie would reach the rank of Major and be awarded an OBE at the 1919 New Years Honours. He would retire in 1920 being promoted to the rank of Lieutenant-Colonel.

=== Art ===
In 1898 Harold went to New York to work as an artist for The Graphic. Other than training by his father he would study under Thomas Graham Jackson and Edwin Austin Abbey. After retirement, he would study etching under Frank Short. During the First World War he would be commissioned to paint for the Royal Air Force. He would be titled as honorary marine painter of the Royal Yacht Squadron in 1934 and serve with the navy in the Second World War. Harold was one of the founders of the Society of Marine Artists and served as its vice president from 1958.
