= Sir Gibbie =

Sir Gibbie is an 1879 novel by the Scottish author George MacDonald, including dialogue written in the Doric dialect of Scotland, that presents a narrative rags-to-riches arc for the title character, in the context of the actual emphasis on the integrity of Gibbie as an obedient Christian servant, and indeed as a Christ-like figure, despite his challenges and circumstances.

Created as a means of supplemental income for MacDonald and his family, the characters of this and thematically related other works of his popular fiction also provided a means by which MacDonald's principal devotion—the spread of the Christian message, and of his conception of Christian obedience—could be furthered as well.

The novel made a significant popular and literary impact in the English-speaking world in its day, both in Great Britain and in the United States, and was reintroduced in the early to mid-20th century through mention of MacDonald and his works by academic and popular Christian author C. S. Lewis.

Sir Gibbie replaced a novel of comparable style by MacDonald, entitled Malcolm, in the 1938 (Swinnerton) edition of the influential Arnold Bennett list of notable English language literature, Literary Taste: How to Form It, as an important fictional work in English (alongside Walter Scott, Benjamin Disraeli, Anthony Trollope, Charlotte Brontë, George Eliot, Samuel Butler, Lewis Carroll, and Robert Louis Stevenson, and others).

== General history ==
Sir Gibbie was one of several popular works that George MacDonald wrote during a period of years where his primary avocation was to serve as a preacher in the dissenting church to which he had been called. Coincident with the growth in the size and needs of his family, the writing MacDonald did during this time, as a sideline, served to provide very necessary income for their sustenance.

== Plot summary ==
Sir Gibbie presents a complex cast of characters from various social levels: a laird; a pair of parish priests, a clever one that yields to worldly influences without being wicked and another clearly presented as pompous and self-righteous.

Gibbie is a destitute, mute boy in Scotland, raised by an alcoholic father. At one point in childhood, he finds himself in murderous company—the "wee Sir Gibbie" is an appellation of affection given the character, by his compatriots, emphasizing the distinctiveness of his character, in particular in relation to his coarse surroundings. He ultimately flies from this, experiencing adventure and misadventure, including tragic punishment meted out for doing good to others.

== Character ==
MacDonald's Christian idealism is reflected in the exceptional saintliness of many of his characters. Gibbie is a completely selfless individual, constantly denying himself for the sake of others.

The character of Gibbie in the novel and in its modern edited production (Wee Sir Gibbie, see below) is presented as a character that the reader is intended to emulate, the character that has rightly discerned the way of the Cross, and so serves as a model for the reader as a contemporary knight-errant, a righter of wrongs. At the same time through his inestimable, literal graciousness, he also presents a less attainable figure, a Christ-figure toward which the reader is intended to strive

== Literary critical perspectives ==
MacDonald met Mark Twain during MacDonald's 1872–73 lecture tour in the United States. Mr. and Mrs. MacDonald, and their son Greville even stayed a few days at the home of Twain's mother-in-law while in New York. Later, MacDonald returned the favour when Twain his wife and daughter, while travelling through Scotland, stayed at his home. Author Ranelda Mack Hunsicker contends that Gibbie provided some of the inspiration for Huckleberry Finn.

Sir Gibbie and other of the MacDonald fictional works are notable for their Doric dialogue. They have been criticised, especially by members of the Scottish Renaissance, for being part of the Kailyard school.

== Publication history ==
First publication of Sir Gibbie by MacDonald was in three volumes, in 1879, by Hurst and Blackett of London, and followed likewise styled novels David Elginbrod, Robert Falkoner, Alec Forbes of Howglen, and others. The first of the three original volumes, with MacDonald's name appearing as "MAC DONALD", followed by Legum Doctor (LL.D., Doctor of Laws), is of 320 pages, and ends with the chapter "Refuge", and Gibbie being taken in by Robert and Janet, their discovery of the scars of his upbringing, and his experiencing alongside their six children the normality of a bed, hearth and home. These citations, in full, are:

- MacDonald, George (1879). Sir Gibbie. Collection of British Authors. Vol. 1. London, England: Hurst and Blackett.
- —— (1879). Sir Gibbie. Collection of British Authors. Vol. 2. London, England: Hurst and Blackett.
- —— (1879). Sir Gibbie. Collection of British Authors. Vol. 3. London, England: Hurst and Blackett.

The entire text was issued by Lippincott in America in a single volume, with the three English volumes appearing separately chaptered, in sequence; set in two columns in smaller font, this volume's presentation of the text was in 210 pages:

- MacDonald, George (1879). Sir Gibbie: A Novel. Philadelphia, Pennsylvania: J. B. Lippincott.

The entirety of the text, set in 62 short chapters, on the order of 1000 pages, and is available with a Broad Scots glossary by its digitizer, John Bechard, from Project Gutenberg.

== Reception ==
MacDonald's editor Elizabeth Yates wrote of Sir Gibbie, "It moved me the way books did when, as a child, the great gates of literature began to open and first encounters with noble thoughts and utterances were unspeakably thrilling."

== Legacy ==
The series of Scottish popular novels re-emerged in the 20th century from relative obscurity, as a result of mentions by academic and popular author C. S. Lewis, who indicated the influences of MacDonald in his creative work. The result, in part by this attention, was the direction of the many followers of Lewis' writings, which include The Chronicles of Narnia, the Space Trilogy, but more relevantly his Till We Have Faces and his poetic work, toward the works of MacDonald.

This focus of attention on MacDonald's old works led to their editing and reproduction as a new series from Bethany House, with the editing and modernising of language done by Michael R. Phillips, alongside several other works of MacDonald's Scottish fiction.

== See also ==
- C. S. Lewis
- Phantastes
- Till We Have Faces
