= Good Words for the Young =

19th-century monthly periodical established in Scotland

- Annual edition of Good Words for the Young front cover, 1870.
- Editor: Norman Macleod, George Macdonald
- Frequency: Monthly
- Publisher: Strahan and Co. Magazine Publishers, London
- Founder: Alexander Strahan
- Founded: 1869
- Final issue: 1877
- Country: Scotland
- Language: English

Good Words for the Young was a 19th-century monthly periodical established in Scotland in November 1868 by the Scottish publisher Alexander Strahan that was specifically for children. In launching it, Strahan promised it would supply "such literature as will not ignobly interest nor frivolously amuse, but convey the wisest instruction in the pleasantest manner". Good Words for the Young was considered "brilliant" by Joseph Gleeson White in his 1906 review, until the first half of 1874, when it changed both its name (to "Good things") and removed the high quality illustrations. The final issue was released in 1977.

== Formation ==
Good words for the Young was first advertised in October 1868 and launched by Strahan in November 1868. The first edition was supposedly edited by Normal Macleod, who at the time was Royal Chaplain for Scotland but there is little evidence that Macleod was involved at that time, due to ill health. As Strahan was a non-partisan, nonsectarian and evangelical Presbyterian, he strongly believed in the power of education to transform society for the better and the use of the printed word to achieve those aims. This led him to launch Good words. The periodical was sold at price of 6 pennies a month, which was considered rather expensive and out of reach of working-class children, ensuring only children from wealthy families could afford it. He stated:

Neither do we see that good literature for the young could, possibly except in very rare cases, make any sort of successful appeal to the sons and daughters of parents who read The Police News and The London Clipper The alarming and. dispiriting part of the case is the gradual spread, upwards in what is called the social scale, of this sort of trash

Many of the stories published in Good Words were written by established authors that were serialised in magazine form. When Good Words for the Young was first launched its list of authors included both Charles and Henry Kingsley, Dinah Craik, Henrietta Keddie, Jean Ingelow, William Brighty Rands, Hans Christian Andersen. One such author was Scottish George Macdonald, whose work At the back of the north wind was serialised from November 1868 to October 1869 and was illustrated by Arthur Hughes. Strahan believed that illustration could be used to enhance the experience of reading his magazine, he featured the work of leading artists of the day including William Holman Hunt, Edward Burne-Jones, Hubert von Herkomer, Arthur Boyd Houghton and John Everett Millais.

The wood engravings for the periodical were created by the firm of George and Edward Dalziel a well known family of engravers who had worked on many of Strahan's periodicals and many others, for example the novels of Walter Scott and Charles Dickens's novels.

== Writers ==
Due to the experience and capabilities of his writers, Strahan was able to provide a wide range of genres for his young readers. These included serialised stories, poems that were humorous and contemplative, hymns, musical compositions, historical articles, historical events as well as plays known as "Revels" and factual pieces designed to inform the reader known as Lectures. These capabilities could be seen in the rich tapestry of writing displayed in the first edition of the periodical. The first story was by Charles Kingsley "Madame How and Lady Why" that was followed by the serialised poems of child-world by Menella Bute Smedley and George MacDonald's At the Back of the North Wind that was also serialised. Other well known works that were serialised in later editions included William Gilbert's King George’s Middy and Henry Kingsley's The Boy in Grey.

== Illustrations ==
The first of issue of the periodical contained 64 pages with 52 illustrations which was reduced to average length of 45 pages with around 30 illustrations on further editions. During Christmas, a special edition was released. In 1869, the first one subtitled "The Amalgamated Robin Redbreasts" contained 54 pages with 22 illustrations. The annual editions were bound in a royal blue cloth with the titles gilted in gold and black. This had the special annual price of 7 shillings and 6 pennies.

Artists who provided illustrations for the first edition included Arthur Hughes John, Francis Arthur Fraser, John Pettie, Johann Baptist Zwecker, Ernest Griset, W. S. Gilbert, W.J. Weigand, Arthur Boyd Houghton, Edward Dalziel, Thomas Dalziel, William Small, Tom Hood and George John Pinwell. John was considered the chief illustrator, having supplied 234 illustrations between 1868 and 1873 that included illustrations for George Macdonalds At the Back of the North Wind, The Princess and the Goblin, Ranald Bannerman's Boyhood as well as for stories written by Henry Kingsley, William Brighty Rands and William Gilbert.

By 1872, Stahan's publishing business began to run into financial difficulties. Illustrations were always central to his product definition, but commissioning those illustrations were expensive and Strahan's lack of financial control led to commissions not getting paid. By November 1873, the last illustration by a recognised British artist was created by Hughes for George MacDonalds poetry collection, Cottage Songs for Cottage Children that had been serialised.

== Late history ==
In October 1869, Macleod was replaced as editor by MacDonald, who was promised £600 a year in remuneration. MacDonald and Strahan has a very close friendship which resulted in MacDonald offering to edit the magazine for free in the third and fourth years as Strahan faced financial difficulties. MacDonald continued to edit the periodical until September 1872, when he had to leave for a tour of America but by that point, Strahans publishing business was facing financial ruin. Strahan was finally forced to retire from his publishing business in 1 March 1872, due to mounting debts. As part of the financial agreement Strahan was left with ownership rights to publish his unmortgaged works. All other periodicals were transferred to his distributor Henry S. King. When he retired, he decided to relaunch the periodical under a new name and made arrangements with King to publish it. Renaming it Good things for the Young, it was launched in 1874 under his own imprint, but was largely unsuccessful due to the poor choice of illustrations and poor writing.

== Gallery ==
"Mercy" by Arthur Hughes for the magazine in 1871, page 145

"Don Jose's Mule" by Arthur Boyd Houghton. Completed in 1870 in page 28

"Wandering in the wood" by Hubert von Herkomer for the magazine in 1870, page 44

"Barbara's Pet Lamb" by Arthur Hughes. It was used in the magazine in 1871, page 100

"Mary and Katie" by E.G. Dalziel. It was used in the 1870 annual, page 518

"Do no sinful action", a hymn by John Pyke Hullah in the 1870 annual, page 371

Part III of "The Village School" poem serialised in the 1870 annual, page 409. An good example of the use of engravings to illustrate the story.

== See also ==
- Good Words
