= Little Daylight =

1871 fairy tale by George MacDonald

Little Daylight is a fairy tale written by George MacDonald and included as a story within a story in At the Back of the North Wind, published in 1871. It has subsequently been published as an independent tale, and in collections of his other fairy tales.

== Synopsis ==
A king and queen gain a daughter, whom they name Daylight. They invite all the fairies who live in the woods by their palace, except one, newly arrived, who lives in the swamp and has everyone convinced she is a witch.

The fairy arrives anyway, and demands the baby's name. On hearing it is "Little Daylight" she says it shall be little daylight, as the princess would sleep all day. Another fairy gives her the gift of waking all night, but the swamp fairy insists that she was not done with the curse, and that Daylight shall wax and wane with the moon. A second fairy says that the curse shall be broken when a prince kisses her without knowing it, and the swamp fairy can not pretend again that she was not done. As the princess grows up, she is beautiful and full of high spirits at the full moon, and as it wanes, turns wan and withered, as if sickly. The older she grows the more extreme the contrast becomes.

A nearby prince has to flee a revolt in his country and comes to the woods. He meets a fairy who is very cryptic with him, and then comes across Daylight dancing in the woods by moonlight. He sees her three nights in a row, as the moon is waxing to full, and falls in love. The third night, they have a conversation in which the princess tells him she has never seen the sun. He meets the fairy again and talks with her, but the fairy can not tell him the full curse.

The swamp fairy discovers his presence and prevents him from finding her again until the moon is more than half gone; then, she thinks the withered princess will not attract him, so she relaxes her guard. The prince finds Daylight again when the moon is new, and she is so withered and feeble that he spends the night trying to minister to her, and when carrying her to help, kisses her. Dawn arrives, Daylight is restored to her full beauty, and she asks the prince whether the sun is coming.
