= At the Back of the North Wind =

1871 novel by George MacDonald

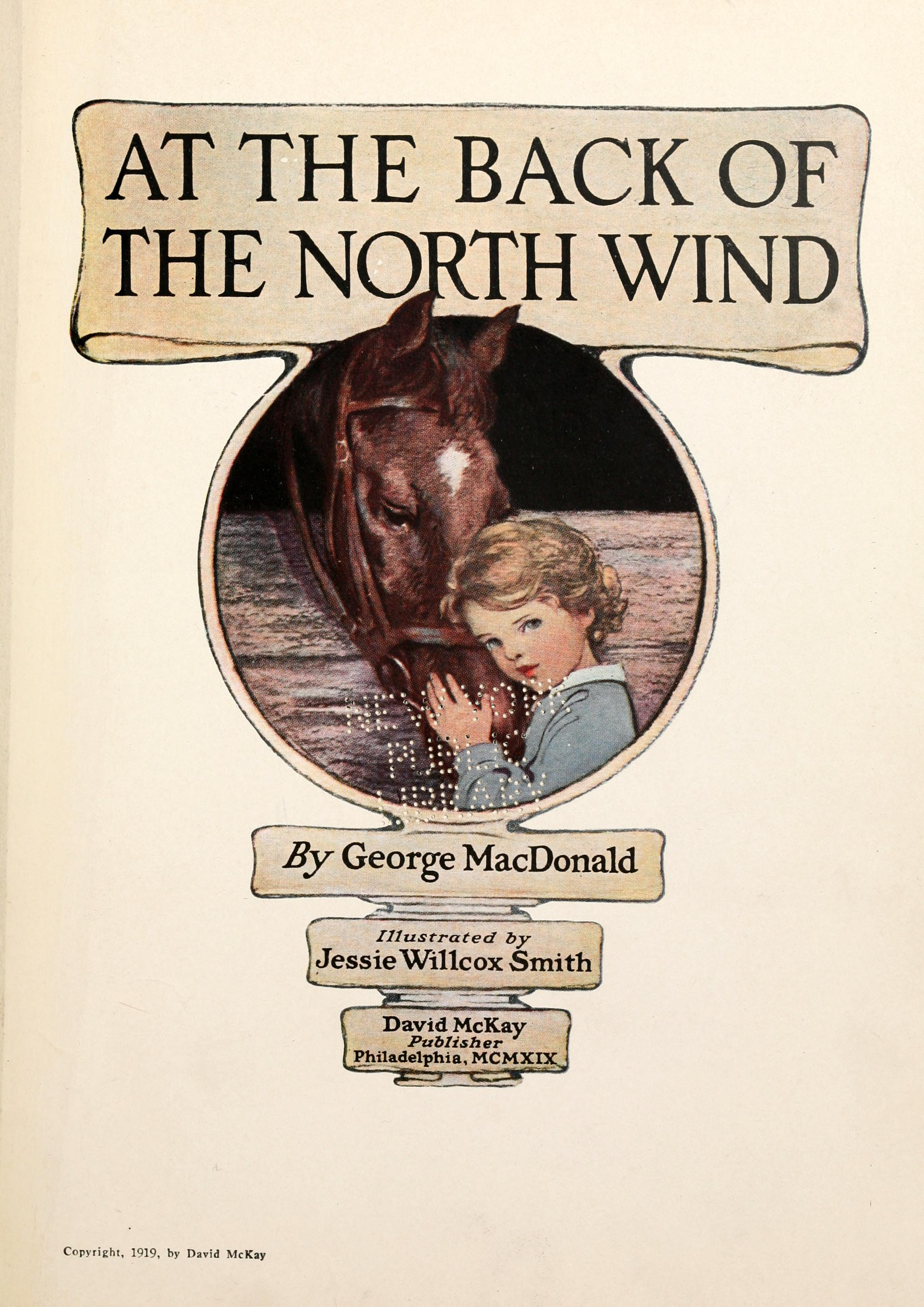
- 1919 edition
- Author: George MacDonald
- Language: English
- Genre: Children's novels
- Publication date: 1871
- Publication place: United Kingdom

At the Back of the North Wind is a children's book written by Scottish author George MacDonald. It was serialized in the children's magazine Good Words for the Young beginning in 1868 and was published in book form in 1871. It is a fantasy centered on a boy named Diamond and his adventures with the North Wind. Diamond travels together with the mysterious Lady North Wind through the nights. The book includes the fairy tale Little Daylight, which has been pulled out as an independent work or added separately to other collections of his fairy tales.

== Plot introduction ==
The book tells the story of a young boy named Diamond. He is a sweet little boy who makes joy everywhere he goes. He fights despair and gloom and brings peace to his family. One night, as he is trying to sleep, Diamond repeatedly plugs up a hole in the loft (also his bedroom) wall to stop the wind from blowing in. However, he soon finds out that this is stopping a goddess-like being, North Wind, from seeing through her window. Diamond befriends her, and North Wind lets him fly with her, taking him on several adventures, until he understands her true nature.

== Themes ==
In this book, MacDonald touches on many theological and philosophical questions, especially concerning theodicy. Today, it is considered one of his masterpieces. According to MacDonald's son and biographer Greville MacDonald, there are many similarities between Diamond and MacDonald's own son Maurice, who died young. Diamond seems to represent Christ, always trying to help others while not completely belonging to this world.

== Abridged editions ==
In 1914, a version "Simplified for Children" by Elizabeth Lewis was published by Lippincott. This newer version shortened the original length of approx. 89,339 words to 27,605 words. It was illustrated by Maria L. Kirk.

== Radio ==
Conservative Christian series Focus on the Family Radio Theatre produced an audio drama adaption in 2005 starring Juliet Stevenson as the title character and Pax Baldwin as Diamond.
