= The Lost Princess =

1875 book by George MacDonald

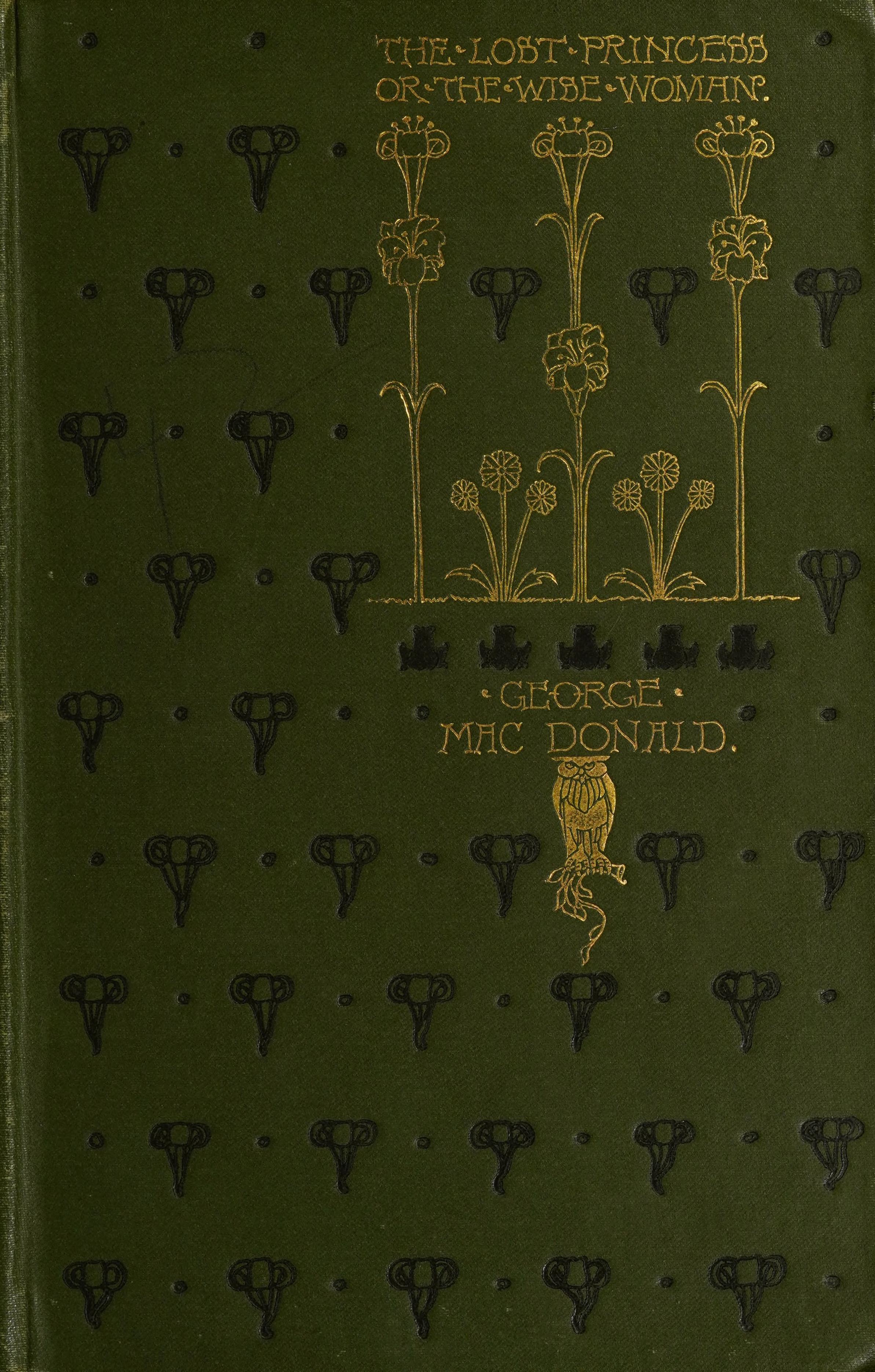
- Author: George MacDonald
- Original title: The Wise Woman: A Parable
- Language: English
- Genre: Children's Fantasy novel
- Publisher: Strahan & Co
- Publication date: 1875
- Publication place: United Kingdom
- Media type: Print

The Lost Princess: A Double Story, first published in 1875 as The Wise Woman: A Parable, is a fairy tale novel by George MacDonald.

The story describes how a woman of mysterious powers pays visits to two very different young girls: one a princess, the other a shepherd's daughter. It has been regarded as ahead of its time in its approach to parenting.

The story draws from the Book of Proverbs in the Bible with its illustrations of Wisdom personified, the fool, and the proud in heart.

== Synopsis ==
Born on the same day, Rosamond, a royal princess, and Agnes, the daughter of common shepherds, are equally spoiled by their parents, Rosamond through being overindulged and Agnes through being overly praised. Both girls grow into self-centered tyrants who make their parents miserable. A mysterious Wise Woman visits the palace and steals Rosamond, bringing her to a cottage deep in the forest, where she shows Rosamond a magic mirror that reflects her Inner Self; the reflection is so disgusting that Rosamond is terrified. Through a combination of the Wise Woman's magic, discipline, and kindness, Rosamond comes to feel ashamed of her behavior but is powerless to control it, having never been taught self-restraint. One day when the Wise Woman leaves her alone, Rosamond discovers a magical art gallery hidden in the Wise Woman's tiny cottage. Stepping through one of the paintings, she finds herself on a hillside near Agnes's home.

Just as Rosamond is escaping, the Wise Woman steals Agnes from the shepherd's croft and takes her to her cottage. All the Wise Woman's efforts to help her fail, as Agnes, while outwardly obedient, is thoroughly conceited. Upon being shown her revolting Inner Self, Agnes resolves not to improve it, but to conceal it. Agnes, too, discovers the portrait gallery, where she is intrigued by an image of the palace. She steps through the painting and makes her way to the palace, where the King and Queen are still seeking their daughter. Agnes is put to work in the kitchens, where she attempts to curry favor by hinting that she knows the location of the lost princess. Eventually word of this reaches the King and Queen, who send soldiers to bring Agnes' parents to the palace.

Agnes's parents search for their missing daughter only to discover Rosamond lost in the wilderness. They tend her back to health and decide to keep her in place of Agnes. At first Rosamond genuinely attempts to be good, spurred on by her love of animals, but she slowly slips back into her old bad habits until she is asked to leave. Rosamond now truly wishes to be a better person and tries to return to the Wise Woman's cottage, only to become lost in the woods. The Wise Woman rescues her and Rosamond begs for her help, having now learned humility. The Wise Woman subjects Rosamond to a series of magical trials, all of which she fails. Finally, she asks the Wise Woman for help in facing these trials and is given aid at a pivotal moment, allowing her to succeed. Looking into the magic mirror once more, Rosamond finds her Inner Self has begun to grow beautiful, only to realize the magic mirror is in fact the Wise Woman's eyes and that the Wise Woman has always seen clearly who she is and how beautiful she could be. Finally the Wise Woman shows her the way home through the portrait gallery.

At the palace, Agnes's parents stand accused of kidnapping the lost princess when Rosamond bursts into the courtroom to speak in their defense. Rosamond is so altered her parents cannot see she is their daughter. The Wise Woman appears and accuses the King and Queen of being so superficial that they cannot recognize goodness when it is standing before them. She curses them to be blind until they change their ways. Rosamond volunteers to care for them until they are cured.

The Wise Woman returns Agnes to her parents. Because Agnes's parents made her what she is, she is now their punishment. The shepherd begs the Wise Woman to teach him how to be a better person and parent, and the Wise Woman agrees to take him to her cottage. Before leaving with the shepherd, the Wise Woman promises Rosamond she will always be near if Rosamond needs her.
