= George MacDonald =

Scottish writer and Christian minister (1824–1905)

The Reverend George MacDonald
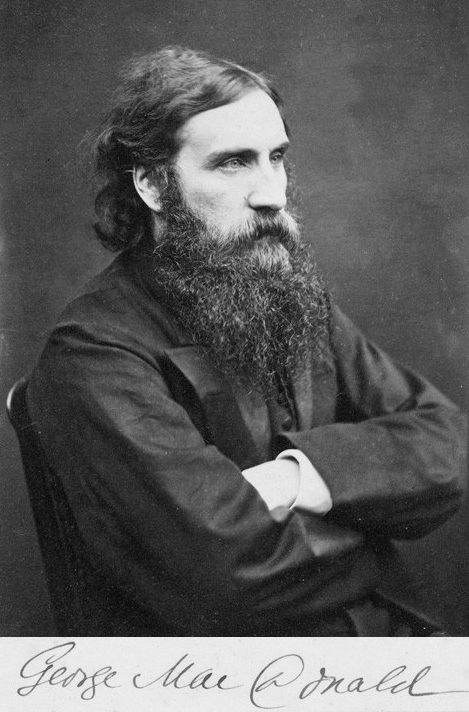
- MacDonald in the 1860s
- Born: 10 December 1824; Huntly, Aberdeenshire, Scotland
- Died: 18 September 1905 (aged 80); Ashtead, Surrey, England
- Education: King's College, University of Aberdeen
- Occupations: Congregational minister, writer, poet, novelist
- Spouse: Louisa Powell (m. 1851)
- Writing career
- Period: 19th century
- Genre: Children's literature
- Notable works: Phantastes (1858); David Elginbrod (1863); At the Back of the North Wind (1871); The Princess and the Goblin (1872); The Princess and Curdie (1883); Lilith (1895)

George MacDonald (10 December 1824 – 18 September 1905) was a Scottish author, poet and Congregational minister. He became a pioneering figure in the field of modern fantasy literature and the mentor of fellow-writer Lewis Carroll. In addition to his fairy tales, MacDonald wrote several works of Christian theology, including several collections of sermons.

== Early life ==
George MacDonald was born on 10 December 1824 in Huntly, Aberdeenshire, Scotland, to George MacDonald, manufacturer, and Helen MacKay. His father, a farmer, was descended from the Clan MacDonald of Glen Coe and a direct descendant of one of the families that suffered in the massacre of 1692.

MacDonald grew up in an unusually literate environment: one of his maternal uncles, Mackintosh MacKay, was a notable Celtic scholar, editor of the Gaelic Highland Dictionary and collector of fairy tales and Celtic oral poetry. His paternal grandfather had supported the publication of an edition of James Macpherson's Ossian, the controversial epic poem based on the Fenian Cycle of Celtic Mythology and which contributed to the starting of European Romanticism. MacDonald's step-uncle was a Shakespeare scholar, and his paternal cousin another Celtic academic. Both his parents were readers, his father favoured scientists and novellists, while his mother had received a classical education which included multiple languages.

MacDonald suffered lapses in health in his early years and was subject to problems with his lungs such as asthma, bronchitis and even a bout of tuberculosis. This last illness was considered a family disease and two of MacDonald's brothers, his mother, and later three of his own children died from the illness. Even in his adult life, he was constantly traveling in search of purer air for his lungs.

MacDonald grew up in the Congregational Church, with an atmosphere of Calvinism. However, his family was atypical, with his paternal grandfather a Catholic-born, fiddle-playing, Presbyterian elder; his paternal grandmother an Independent church rebel; his mother was a sister to the Gaelic-speaking radical who became moderator of the Free Church, while his step-mother, to whom he was also very close, was the daughter of a priest of the Scottish Episcopal Church.

MacDonald graduated from the King's College, Aberdeen, in 1845 with a degree in chemistry and physics. He spent the next several years struggling with matters of faith and deciding what to do with his life. His son, biographer Greville MacDonald, stated that his father could have pursued a career in the medical field but he speculated that lack of money put an end to this prospect. It was only in 1848 that MacDonald began theological training at Highbury College for the Congregational ministry.

== Early career ==
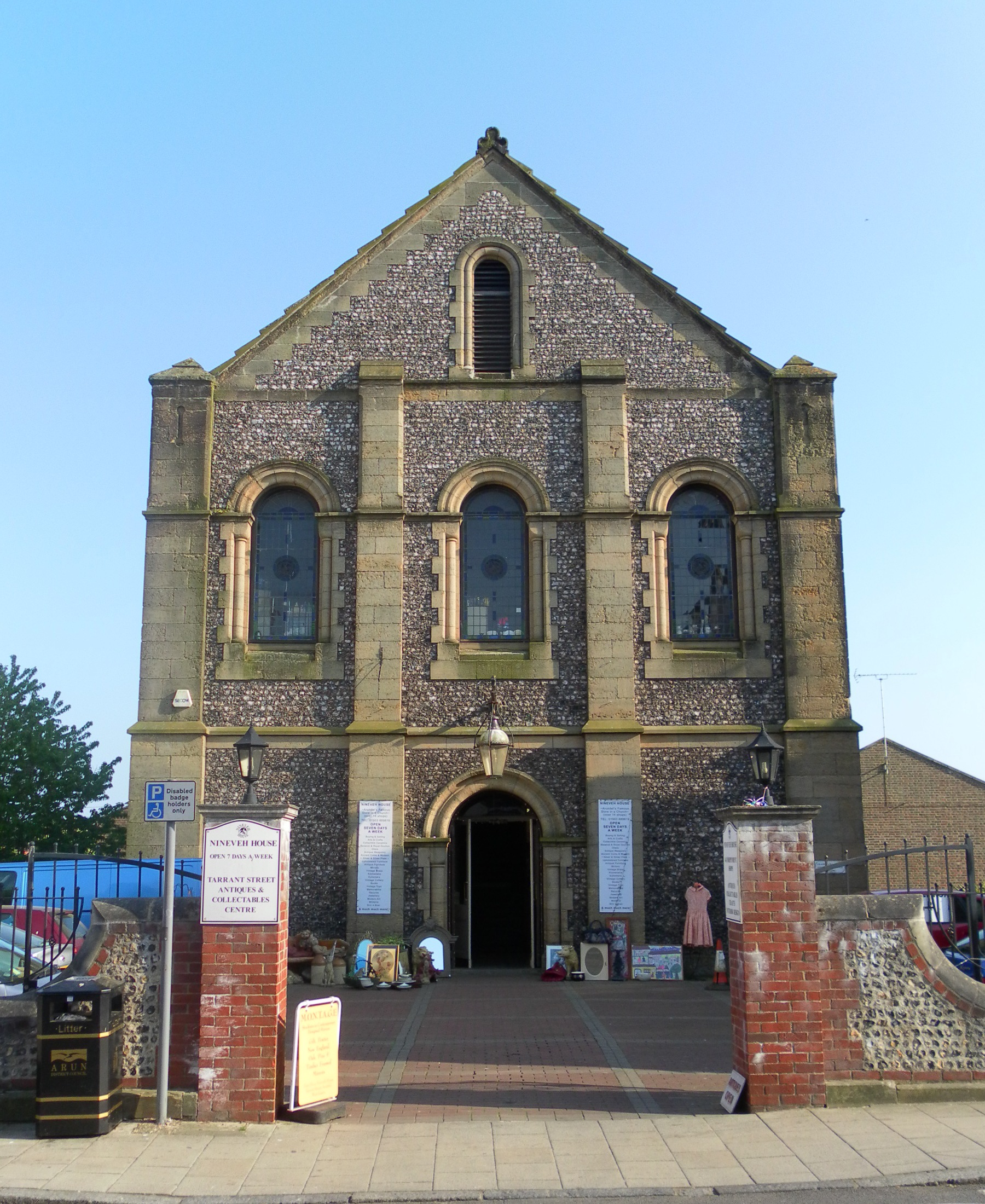
MacDonald was the pastor of Trinity Congregational Church, Arundel from 1850.

MacDonald was appointed minister of Trinity Congregational Church, Arundel, in 1850, after briefly serving as a locum minister (a temporary replacement for a parish minister) in Ireland. However, his sermons—which preached God's universal love and that everyone was capable of redemption—met with little favour and his stipend was cut in half. In May 1853, MacDonald tendered his resignation from his pastoral duties at Arundel. Later he was engaged in ministerial work in Manchester, leaving that because of poor health. Lady Byron helped convince MacDonald to travel to Algiers in 1856 with the hope that the sojourn would help turn his health around. When he got back, he settled in London and taught for some time at the University of London. MacDonald was also for a time editor of Good Words for the Young.

== Writing career ==
MacDonald is often regarded as the founding father of modern fantasy writing. His best-known works are Phantastes (1858), The Princess and the Goblin (1872), At the Back of the North Wind (1868–1871), and Lilith (1895), all fantasy novels, and fairy tales such as "The Light Princess", "The Golden Key", and "The Wise Woman". MacDonald claimed that "I write, not for children, but for the child-like, whether they be of five, or fifty, or seventy-five." MacDonald also published some volumes of sermons, the pulpit not having proved an unreservedly successful venue.

After his literary success, MacDonald went on to do a lecture tour in the United States in 1872–1873, after being invited to do so by a lecture company, the Boston Lyceum Bureau. On the tour, MacDonald lectured about other poets such as Robert Burns, Shakespeare, and Tom Hood. He performed this lecture to great acclaim, speaking in Boston to crowds in the neighbourhood of three thousand people.

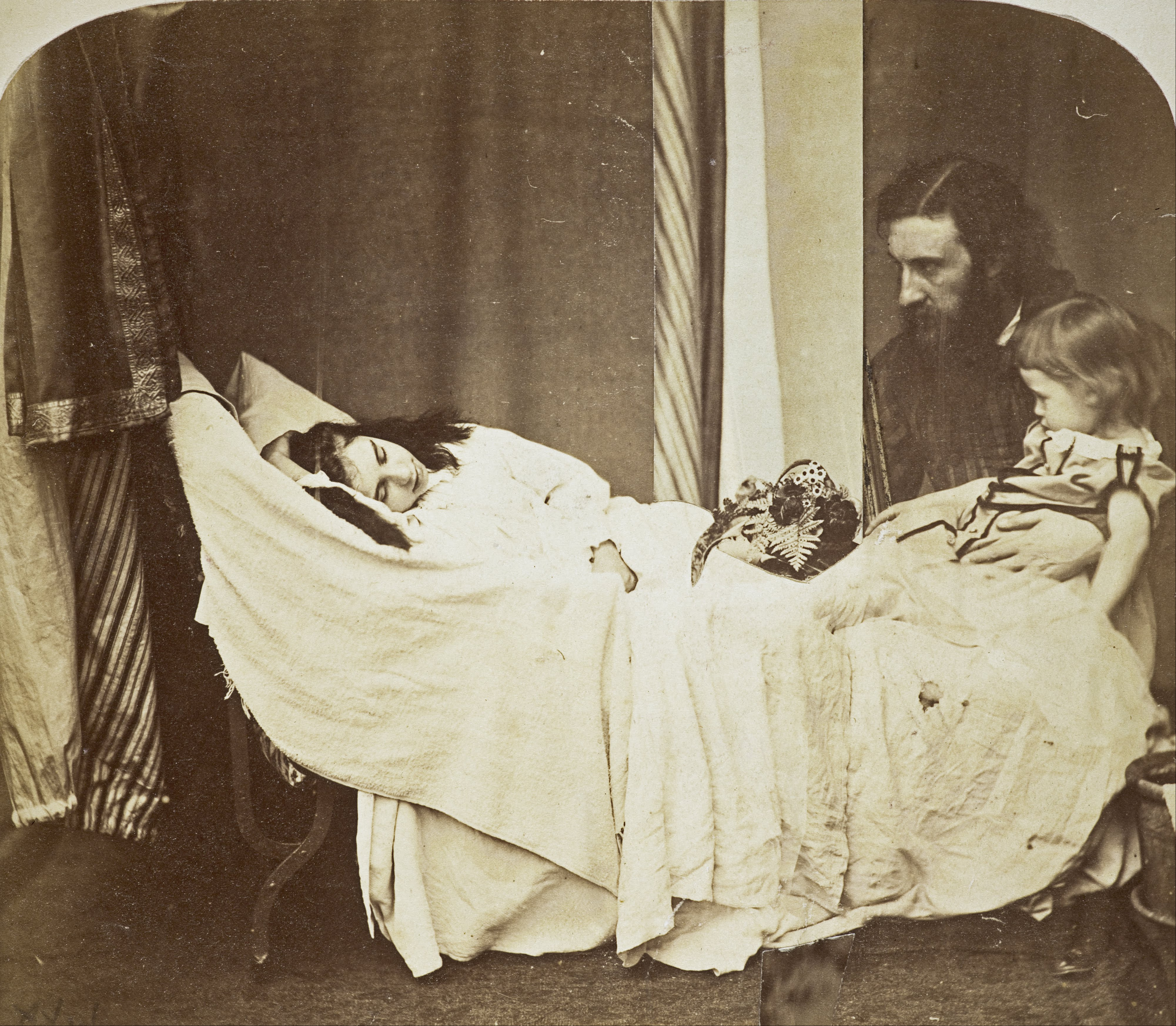
George MacDonald with son Ronald (right) and daughter Mary (left) in 1864. Photograph by Lewis Carroll

MacDonald served as a mentor to Lewis Carroll; it was MacDonald's advice, and the enthusiastic reception of Alice by MacDonald's many sons and daughters, that convinced Carroll to submit Alice for publication. Carroll, one of the finest Victorian photographers, also created photographic portraits of several of the MacDonald children. MacDonald was also friends with John Ruskin and served as a go-between in Ruskin's long courtship with Rose La Touche. While in America he was befriended by Longfellow and Walt Whitman.

MacDonald's use of fantasy as a literary medium for exploring the human condition greatly influenced a generation of notable authors, including C. S. Lewis, who featured him as a character in his The Great Divorce. In his introduction to his MacDonald anthology, Lewis speaks highly of MacDonald's views:

This collection, as I have said, was designed not to revive MacDonald's literary reputation but to spread his religious teaching. Hence most of my extracts are taken from the three volumes of Unspoken Sermons. My own debt to this book is almost as great as one man can owe to another: and nearly all serious inquirers to whom I have introduced it acknowledge that it has given them great help—sometimes indispensable help toward the very acceptance of the Christian faith. ...

I know hardly any other writer who seems to be closer, or more continually close, to the Spirit of Christ Himself. Hence his Christ-like union of tenderness and severity. Nowhere else outside the New Testament have I found terror and comfort so intertwined. ...

In making this collection I was discharging a debt of justice. I have never concealed the fact that I regarded him as my master; indeed I fancy I have never written a book in which I did not quote from him. But it has not seemed to me that those who have received my books kindly take even now sufficient notice of the affiliation. Honesty drives me to emphasize it.

Others he influenced include J. R. R. Tolkien, Madeleine L'Engle, and David Lindsay. MacDonald's non-fantasy novels, such as Alec Forbes, had their influence as well; they were among the first realistic Scottish novels, and as such MacDonald has been credited with founding the "kailyard school" of Scottish writing.

G. K. Chesterton cited The Princess and the Goblin as a book that had "made a difference to my whole existence, ... in showing "how near both the best and the worst things are to us from the first ... and making all the ordinary staircases and doors and windows into magical things."

== Later life ==
In 1877 he was given a civil list (monastic poverty/civil duty) pension. From 1879 he and his family lived in Bordighera, in a place much loved by British expatriates, the Riviera dei Fiori in Liguria, Italy, almost on the French border. In that locality there also was an Anglican church, All Saints, which he attended. Deeply enamoured of the Riviera, he spent 20 years there, writing almost half of his whole literary production, especially the fantasy work. MacDonald founded a literary studio in that Ligurian town, naming it Casa Coraggio (Bravery House). It soon became one of the most renowned cultural centres of that period, well attended by British and Italian travellers, and by locals, with presentations of classic plays and readings of Dante and Shakespeare often being held.

In 1900 he moved into St George's Wood, Haslemere, a house designed for him by his son, Robert, its building overseen by his eldest son, Greville.

George MacDonald died on 18 September 1905 in Ashtead, Surrey, England. He was cremated in Woking, Surrey, and his ashes were buried in Bordighera, in the English cemetery, along with his wife Louisa and daughters Lilia and Grace.

== Personal life ==
MacDonald married Louisa Powell in Hackney in 1851, with whom he raised a family of eleven children: Lilia Scott (1852–1891), Mary Josephine (1853–1878), Caroline Grace (1854–1884), Greville Matheson (1856–1944), Irene (1857–1939), Winifred Louise (1858–1946), Ronald (1860–1933), Robert Falconer (1862–1913), Maurice (1864–1879), Bernard Powell (1865–1928), and George Mackay (1867–1909).

His son Greville became a noted medical specialist, a pioneer of the Peasant Arts movement, wrote numerous fairy tales for children, and ensured that new editions of his father's works were published. Another son, Ronald, became a novelist. His daughter Mary was engaged to the artist Edward Robert Hughes until her death in 1878. Ronald's son, Philip MacDonald (George MacDonald's grandson), became a Hollywood screenwriter.

Tuberculosis caused the death of several family members, including Lilia, Mary Josephine, Grace, and Maurice, as well as one granddaughter and a daughter-in-law. MacDonald was said to have been particularly affected by the death of Lilia, his eldest.

There is a blue plaque on his home at 20 Albert Street, Camden, London.

== Theology ==
According to biographer William Raeper, MacDonald's theology "celebrated the rediscovery of God as Father, and sought to encourage an intuitive response to God and Christ through quickening his readers' spirits in their reading of the Bible and their perception of nature."

MacDonald's oft-mentioned universalism is not the idea that everyone will automatically be saved, but is closer to Gregory of Nyssa in the view that all will ultimately repent and be restored to God.

MacDonald appears to have never felt comfortable with some aspects of Calvinist doctrine, feeling that its principles were inherently "unfair"; when the doctrine of predestination was first explained to him, he burst into tears (although assured that he was one of the elect). Later novels, such as Robert Falconer and Lilith, show a distaste for the idea that God's electing love is limited to some and denied to others.

G K Chesterton (author of Father Brown)noted that only a man who had "escaped" Calvinism could say that God is easy to please and hard to satisfy.

MacDonald rejected the doctrine of penal substitutionary atonement as developed by John Calvin, which argues that Christ has taken the place of sinners and is punished by the wrath of God in their place, believing that in turn it raised serious questions about the character and nature of God. Instead, he taught that Christ had come to save people from their sins, and not from a Divine penalty for their sins: the problem was not the need to appease a wrathful God, but the disease of cosmic evil itself. MacDonald frequently described the atonement in terms similar to the Christus Victor theory. MacDonald posed the rhetorical question, "Did he not foil and slay evil by letting all the waves and billows of its horrid sea break upon him, go over him, and die without rebound—spend their rage, fall defeated, and cease? Verily, he made atonement!"

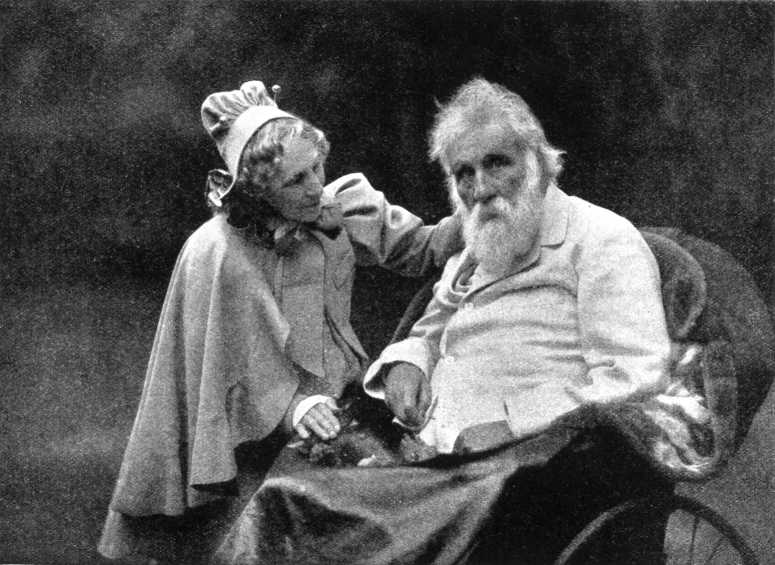
MacDonald with his wife Louisa in 1901 at their 50th wedding anniversary

MacDonald was convinced that God does not punish except to amend, and that the sole end of His greatest anger is the amelioration of the guilty. As the doctor uses fire and steel in certain deep-seated diseases, so God may use hell-fire if necessary to heal the hardened sinner. MacDonald declared, "I believe that no hell will be lacking which would help the just mercy of God to redeem his children." MacDonald posed the rhetorical question, "When we say that God is Love, do we teach men that their fear of Him is groundless?" He replied, "No. As much as they were will come upon them, possibly far more. ... The wrath will consume what they call themselves; so that the selves God made shall appear."

However, true repentance, in the sense of freely chosen moral growth, is essential to this process, and, in MacDonald's optimistic view, inevitable for all beings (see universal reconciliation).

MacDonald states his theological views most distinctly in the sermon "Justice", found in the third volume of Unspoken Sermons.

== Catalogue ==
The following is an incomplete list of MacDonald's published works in the genre now referred to as fantasy:

=== Fantasy ===
- Phantastes: A Faerie Romance for Men and Women

- MacDonald, George (1858). Phantastes: A faerie romance for men and women. London: Smith, Elder & Co.

- MacDonald, George (1902) [1862]. Cross purposes and other stories. London: London Chatto & Windus.
- MacDonald, George (1872) [1864]. The portent : a story of the inner vision of the Highlanders, commonly called the second sight. Boston: Loring.
- MacDonald, George (1867). Dealings with the fairies. London: Alexander Strahan., containing "The Golden Key", "The Light Princess", "The Shadows", and other short stories
- MacDonald, George (1909) [1871]. At the back of the North Wind. London: J.B. Lippincott Company.
- Works of Fancy and Imagination (1871) The complete works of MacDonald collected in 10 volumes:

- MacDonald, George (1871). Within and Without and A Hidden Life. Vol. 1. London: Strahan and Co.
- MacDonald, George (1871). Poems, The Gospel Women, Sonnets, and Organ Songs. Vol. 2. London: Strahan and Co.
- MacDonald, George (1871). Violin Songs; Songs of Days and Nights; A Book of Dreams; Roadside Poems and Poems for Children. Vol. 3. London: Strahan and Co.
- MacDonald, George (1871). Parables; Ballads plus Scotch Songs and Ballads. Vol. 4. London: Strahan and Co.
- MacDonald, George (1871). Phantastes. Vol. 5. London: Strahan and Co.
- MacDonald, George (1871). Phantastes, A Faerie Romance. Vol. 6. London: Strahan and Co.
- MacDonald, George (1871). The Portent;. Vol. 7. London: Strahan and Co.
- MacDonald, George (1871). The Light Princess; The Giant's Heart and The Shadows. Vol. 8. London: Strahan and Co.
- MacDonald, George (1871). Cross Purposes; The Golden Key; The Carasoyn and Little Daylight (PDF). Vol. 9. London: Strahan and Co.
- MacDonald, George (1871). The Cruel Painter; The Castle; The Wow o' Rivven; The Broken Swords; The Gray Wolf and Uncle Cornelius His Story. Vol. 10. London: Strahan and Co.

- MacDonald, George (1911) [1872]. The princess and the goblin. London: Blackie and Son.
- MacDonald, George (1875). The Wise Woman: A Parable. London: Strahan and Co. (Published also as "The Lost Princess: A Double Story"; or as "A Double Story".)
- Multiple versions with different content of The Light Princess and other Stories
- The Gifts of the Child Christ and Other Tales (1882; republished as Stephen Archer and Other Tales) 1908 edition by Edwin Dalton, London was illustrated by Cyrus Cuneo and G. H. Evison.

- MacDonald, George (1882). The gifts of the child Christ : and other tales. Vol. I. London: Sampson Low, Marston, Searle & Rivington. OCLC 779254726.
- MacDonald, George (1882). The gifts of the child Christ : and other tales. Vol. II. London: Sampson Low, Marston, Searle & Rivington. OCLC 779254726.

- The Day Boy and the Night Girl (1882)
- MacDonald, George (1883). The princess and Curdie. Philadelphia: J. B. Lippincott. OCLC 1050812999., a sequel to The Princess and the Goblin
- MacDonald, George (1896) [1895]. Lilith: A romance (2nd ed.). London: Chatto and Windus.

=== Fiction ===
- David Elginbrod (1863; republished in edited form as The Tutor's First Love), originally published in three volumes
- Adela Cathcart (1864); contains many fantasy stories told by the characters within the larger story, including "The Light Princess", "The Shadows".
- Alec Forbes of Howglen (1865; edited by Michael Phillips and republished as The Maiden's Bequest; edited to children's version by Michael Phillips and republished as Alec Forbes and His Friend Annie)
- Annals of a Quiet Neighbourhood (1867)
- Guild Court: A London Story (1868; republished in edited form as The Prodigal Apprentice). 1908 edition by Edwin Dalton, London was illustrated by G. H. Evison. Available online at HathiTrust.
- Robert Falconer (1868; republished in edited form as The Musician's Quest)
- The Seaboard Parish (1869), a sequel to Annals of a Quiet Neighbourhood
- Ranald Bannerman's Boyhood. London: Strahan and Co. 1871. (republished in edited form as The Boyhood of Ranald Bannerman by Dan Hamilton, 1987)
- Wilfred Cumbermede. London: Strahan and Co. 1872.
- The Vicar's Daughter (1871), a sequel to Annals of a Quiet Neighborhood and The Seaboard Parish. 1908 edition by Sampson Low and Company, London was illustrated by Cyrus Cuneo and G. H. Evison.
- The History of Gutta Percha Willie, the Working Genius (1873; republished in edited form as The Genius of Willie MacMichael), usually called simply Gutta Percha Willie
- Malcolm (1875; republished in edited form by Michael Phillips as The Fisherman's Lady))
- St. George and St. Michael (1876; edited by Dan Hamilton and republished as The Last Castle)
- Thomas Wingfold, Curate (1876; republished in edited form as The Curate's Awakening)
- The Marquis of Lossie (1877; republished in edited form as The Marquis' Secret), the second book of Malcolm
- Sir Gibbie (1879): Sir Gibbie, Volume 1. London: Hurst and Blackett. 1879. With simultaneous publication of Vol. 2 and Vol. 3, each of ca. 300 pages. Also issued by Lippincott in America in a single volume set in two columns in smaller font, in 210 pages, Sir Gibbie: A Novel. Philadelphia, PA: J. B. Lippincott. 1879. The entirety of the original text is available with a Broad Scots glossary by its digitizer, John Bechard, see Sir Gibbie. 1879 – via Gutenberg.org. Republished in edited form as MacDonald, George (1990). Phillips, Michael R. (ed.). Wee Sir Gibbie of the Highlands. George MacDonald Classics. Bethany House. ISBN 978-1556611391. Also as The Baronet's Song.
- Paul Faber, Surgeon (1879; republished in edited form as The Lady's Confession), a sequel to Thomas Wingfold, Curate
- Mary Marston (1881; republished in edited form as A Daughter's Devotion and The Shopkeeper's Daughter)
- Warlock o' Glenwarlock (1881; republished in edited form as Castle Warlock and The Laird's Inheritance)
- Weighed and Wanting (1882; republished in edited form as A Gentlewoman's Choice)
- Donal Grant (1883; republished in edited form as The Shepherd's Castle), a sequel to Sir Gibbie
- What's Mine's Mine (1886; republished in edited form as The Highlander's Last Song)
- Home Again: A Tale (1887; republished in edited form as The Poet's Homecoming)
- The Elect Lady (1888; republished in edited form as The Landlady's Master)
- A Rough Shaking (1891; republished in edited form as The Wanderings of Clare Skymer)
- There and Back (1891; republished in edited form as The Baron's Apprenticeship), a sequel to Thomas Wingfold, Curate and Paul Faber, Surgeon
- The Flight of the Shadow (1891)
- Heather and Snow (1893)

- MacDonald, George (1893). Heather and Snow. Vol. I. Piccadilly, London: Chatto and Windus.
- MacDonald, George (1893). Heather and Snow. Vol. II. Piccadilly, London: Chatto and Windus.

- MacDonald, George (1988). The peasant girl's dream. Minneapolis: Bethany House Publishers. ISBN 1556610238. (republished in edited form in 1988)

- Salted with fire

- MacDonald, George (1900) [1897]. Salted with fire (New ed.). London: Hurst and Blackett Limited.

- MacDonald, George (1 March 1988). The minister's restoration. Minneapolis: Bethany House Publishers. ISBN 978-0871239051. (republished in edited form in 1988)

- Far Above Rubies (1898)

=== Poetry ===
The following is a list of MacDonald's published poetic works:

- Twelve of the Spiritual Songs of Novalis (1851), privately printed translation of the poetry of Novalis
- MacDonald, George (1872) [1855]. Within and Without: A Dramatic Poem. Vol. I. New York: Scribner, Armstrong and Company. pp. 6–223.
- MacDonald, George (1857). Poems. London: Longman, Brown, Green, Longmans, & Roberts.
- MacDonald, George (1864). A Hidden Life and Other Poems. London: Spottiswoode and Co.
- MacDonald, George (1868) [1867]. The disciple, and other poems. London: Chatto and Windus. OCLC 697720157.
- MacDonald, George (1876). Exotics : a translation of the spiritual songs of Novalis, the hymn-book of Luther, and other poems from the German and Italian. London: Strahan and Co, Publishers.
- MacDonald, George (1872). Dramatic and miscellaneous poems. New York: Scribner, Amstrong and Company. OCLC 609594060.

- Volume I:Within and Without pp 1-219
- Volume II:The Hiden Life and Other Poems pp 221-509

- MacDonald, George (1892) [1880]. A Book of Strife, in the Form of the Diary of an old Soul. London: Longmans, Green and Co. Original privately printed
- MacDonald, George; Matheson, Greville; Macdonald, John Hill (1883). MacDonald, George (ed.). A threefold cord : poems by three friends. London: W Hughes. OCLC 4118583. privately printed, with Greville Matheson and John Hill MacDonald
- MacDonald, George (1887). Poems. New York: E. P. Dutton.
- The Poetical Works of George MacDonald, 2 Volumes (1893)
- MacDonald, George (1893). Scotch songs and ballads. Aberdeen: John Rae Smith. OCLC 17495112.
- MacDonald, George (1897). Rampolli, growths from a long-planted root. London: Longmans, Greens and Co. OCLC 6436162.

=== Nonfiction ===
The following is a list of MacDonald's published works of non-fiction:

- Unspoken Sermons (1867)
- England's Antiphon (1868, 1874)
- The Miracles of Our Lord (1870)
- Cheerful Words from the Writing of George MacDonald (1880), compiled by E. E. Brown
- Orts: Chiefly Papers on the Imagination, and on Shakespeare (1882)
- "Preface" (1884) to Letters from Hell (1866) by Valdemar Adolph Thisted
- The Tragedie of Hamlet, Prince of Denmarke: A Study With the Text of the Folio of 1623 (1885)
- Unspoken Sermons, Second Series (1885)
- Unspoken Sermons, Third Series (1889)
- A Cabinet of Gems, Cut and Polished by Sir Philip Sidney; Now, for the More Radiance, Presented Without Their Setting by George MacDonald (1891)
- The Hope of the Gospel (1892)
- A Dish of Orts (1893)
- Beautiful Thoughts from George MacDonald (1894), compiled by Elizabeth Dougall

== See also ==
- Christian existentialism
- Fairytale fantasy
- Mythopoeia
