= The Shadows (fairy tale) =

The Shadows is a fairy tale by George MacDonald.

== Plot introduction ==
Ralph Rinkelmann is a writer, who is selected by fairies to be the king of the fairies. While he is ill, they carry him off and crown him as king. The strange Shadows spend their existence casting themselves upon the walls and forming pictures of various sorts: mimicking evil actions of those who have done wrong in the hopes of causing their repentance, playing a comic dumb-show to inspire a playwright and dancing to inspire a musician, nudging a little girl to comfort her grandfather, and playing with a sick little boy as he waits for his mother to return home. For all that their forms are black, their hearts are of the whitest. The story ends with Ralph Rinkelman being comforted.
