= The Day Boy and the Night Girl =

1880 novel by George MacDonald

The Day Boy and Night Girl, also referred to as The Romance of Photogen and Nycteris, is an 1882 fairy tale novel by George MacDonald. A version of this story appeared in Harper's Young People as a series beginning on 2 December 1879 and completing on 6 January 1880.

== Plot ==
The Day Boy and the Night Girl begins by telling of a witch named Watho who, in her pursuit of complete knowledge, undertook an experiment to mould two people from birth by strictly controlling their environments.

Watho convinced two expectant mothers to visit her castle. Lady Aurora (whose ambassador husband was away on business) was given spacious, sunlit rooms to stay in; she gave birth to a boy. The witch promptly whisked him away, sending his mother back to her home burdened with the lie that her son had died shortly after birth. The other woman (who had recently been widowed and become blind) Watho settled in windowless, tomblike, but comfortable chambers elsewhere in the castle. Vesper died in childbirth, leaving her daughter to the witch's keeping.

Watho did everything in her power to ensure that the boy Photogen grew up strong, able, and fearless. The boy grew up adept in hunting and riding. However, her foremost concern regarding him was that he should never see the night. Watho desired the opposite for the girl Nycteris, who knew no other world than the stony chambers she had been born in and no other light than that provided by the single dim lamp. Watho, however, taught her music, and her attendant read her books which sharpened her imagination.

It came about that Nycteris, in her sixteenth year, found her way out of these chambers into a night lit by a full-moon. Nycteris was filled with wonder at this glorious new light and the rest of nature; she returned to her rooms before daybreak, desiring to see the outdoors again and not wanting to spoil her chance by arousing Watho's suspicions. Around the same time, Photogen (who spent his days hunting) one morning spied a big cat of some sort slinking off to the forest and took it in his mind to hunt this skilled hunter. As the sun went down, Photogen left to hunt the nocturnal beast, violating the witch's constraint. Once darkness fell, Photogen was beset with terror. He came across Nycteris in one of her outings, and gathered some measure of comfort from the strange girl's calm. She agreed to watch over him while he slept, and so it was that she was for the first time yet outdoors when the sun rose. Photogen regained his courage immediately; assuring Nycteris that there was now nothing to fear, he went on his way, despite her terrified pleas that he stay and protect her from the blinding light.

Photogen, wishing to prove his courage and driven by guilt on how he left Nycteris, stayed up for other nights, only to experience similar results. This caused him to become ill, which made Watho angry. To punish him, he was locked in his room and all sunlight was blocked. Watho also punished Nycteris by leaving her outside while she slept, thinking the daylight will terrify her to death.

When Nycteris woke up, she slowly managed to deal with the brightness of the day, and understood that it meant no harm. She fell asleep again as night came, until she was found by Photogen who escaped his chambers and still afraid of the night, but mustered the courage to go out. They both decided to escape Watho's cruelty, but had a debate on whether to do it now or wait for the sun. Nycteris convinced a weakening Photogen to not waste time, make peace with the night as she did with the day, and run away immediately, guiding him in avoiding any dangerous or scary animals thanks to her strong sense of smell and hearing. When the day came, Photogen regained his strength and carried Nycteris as they continued their escape.

Photogen and Nycteris saw a red werewolf chasing after them. Photogen hid Nycteris into safety and used his bow and arrows to kill the werewolf, who they realize was a transformed, wrathful Watho all along. Grateful for ending her terror, Watho's servants helped Photogen and Nycteris head to the king and queen to tell their tale. Photogens' parents, who were close confidantes of the king and queen, recognized him as their son and wholeheartedly accepted Nycteris.

Photogen and Nycteris married, and the king granted them Watho's land and estate; they continued to rely on and rejoice in each other's strengths, to the point that Photogen came to prefer the night and Nycteris the day.

== Etymology of character names ==
- Photogen (from Ancient Greek φῶς (photo-) 'light' and -γενής (-genēs) 'producer of')
- Nycteris (from Ancient Greek νύχτα (nýchta) 'night')
- Aurora (from Latin aurōra 'dawn, dawn goddess')
- Vesper (from Latin vesperī 'evening')

== Themes ==
Elsewhere in his writings, MacDonald used the more orthodox symbols of light representing goodness and darkness standing for ignorance and evil. In The Day Boy and the Night Girl such a distinction is not clearly set forward, although night and day are vividly polarised. MacDonald may seem to be leaning towards Manichaeism by allowing as much credit to the night as he does in The Day Boy and the Night Girl, but he avoids this by linking evil not with darkness, but rather with self-love. In this way, evil is not portrayed as a force striving against good (which suggests a power equal but opposite to good) but is seen rather as a gaze misdirected inwards towards the self. Photogen and Nycteris are both less than whole beings until they learn to care for each other in spite of their differences and opposing weaknesses.

The three main characters each seek progress, but through different channels. Watho attempts to gather and subjugate, Photogen tries to conquer through ability, and Nycteris uses her imagination to further her understanding and knowledge of the world to better see how she fits in it. The Day Boy and the Night Girl is essentially a tale which depicts MacDonald's belief in the imagination's ability to take the focus off of self, thereby opening the imaginer to a world of companionships which can lead to true wholeness.

== Adaptations ==
- An opera based on MacDonald's work was written by Jordan Wentworth Farrar in 2008, with a world premiere in New York City in 2009.
- Matt Buchanan has also authored a play on the same theme.
- A musical version with book and lyrics by Katherine Baldwin Eng and music by James Rubio premiered in 2008.
- Kate Ramsey expands on the fairy tale in her 2020 novel Oh Wretched Moon. She does not deviate from the original story, but rather goes into depth imagining additional dialog and character details.

== See also ==
- Ladyhawke, a 1985 film with a similar plotline
