= Alec Forbes of Howglen =

Book by George MacDonald

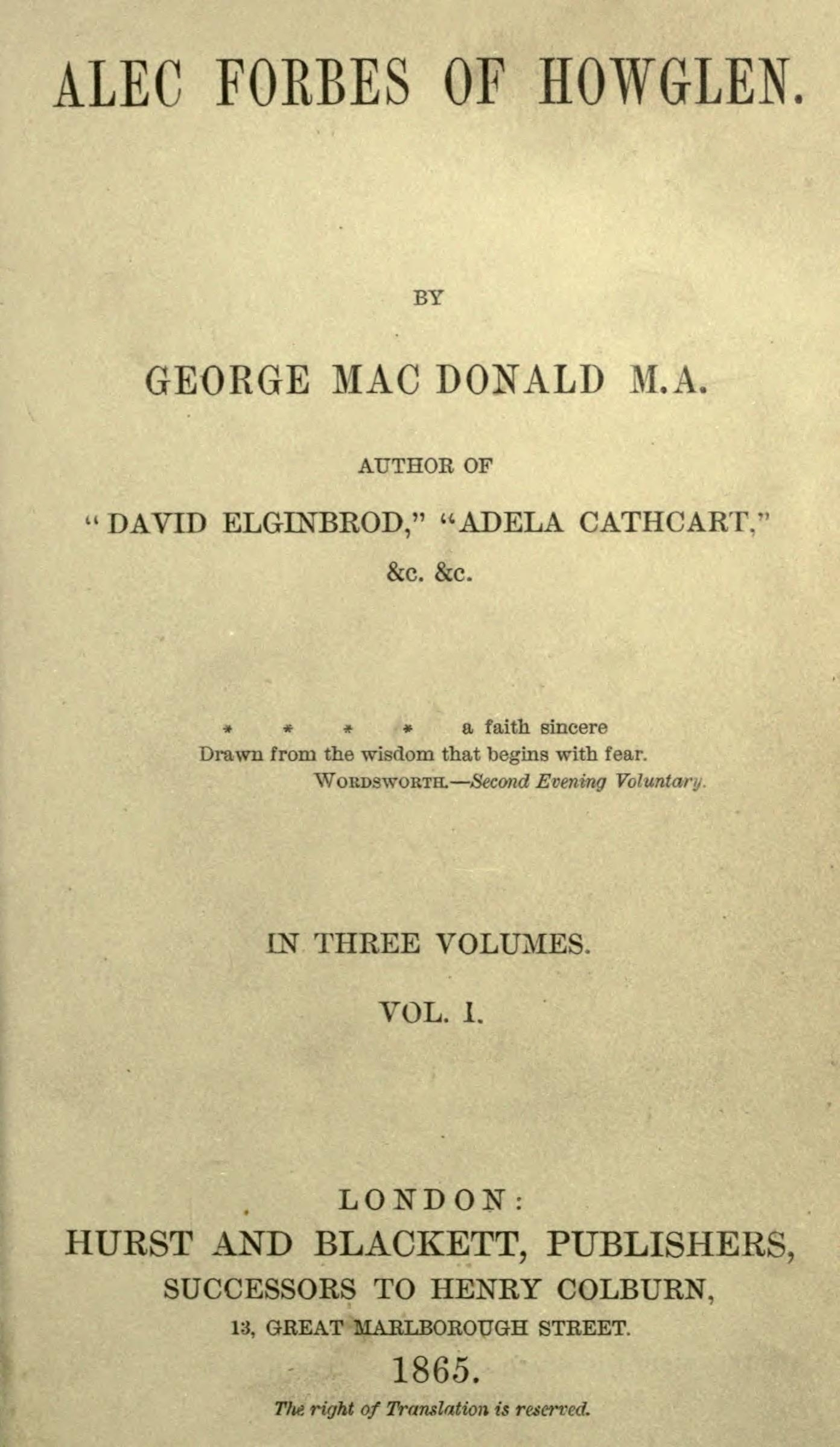
- Author: George Macdonald
- Language: Doric
- Published: 1865
- Publisher: Hurst & Blackett, London.

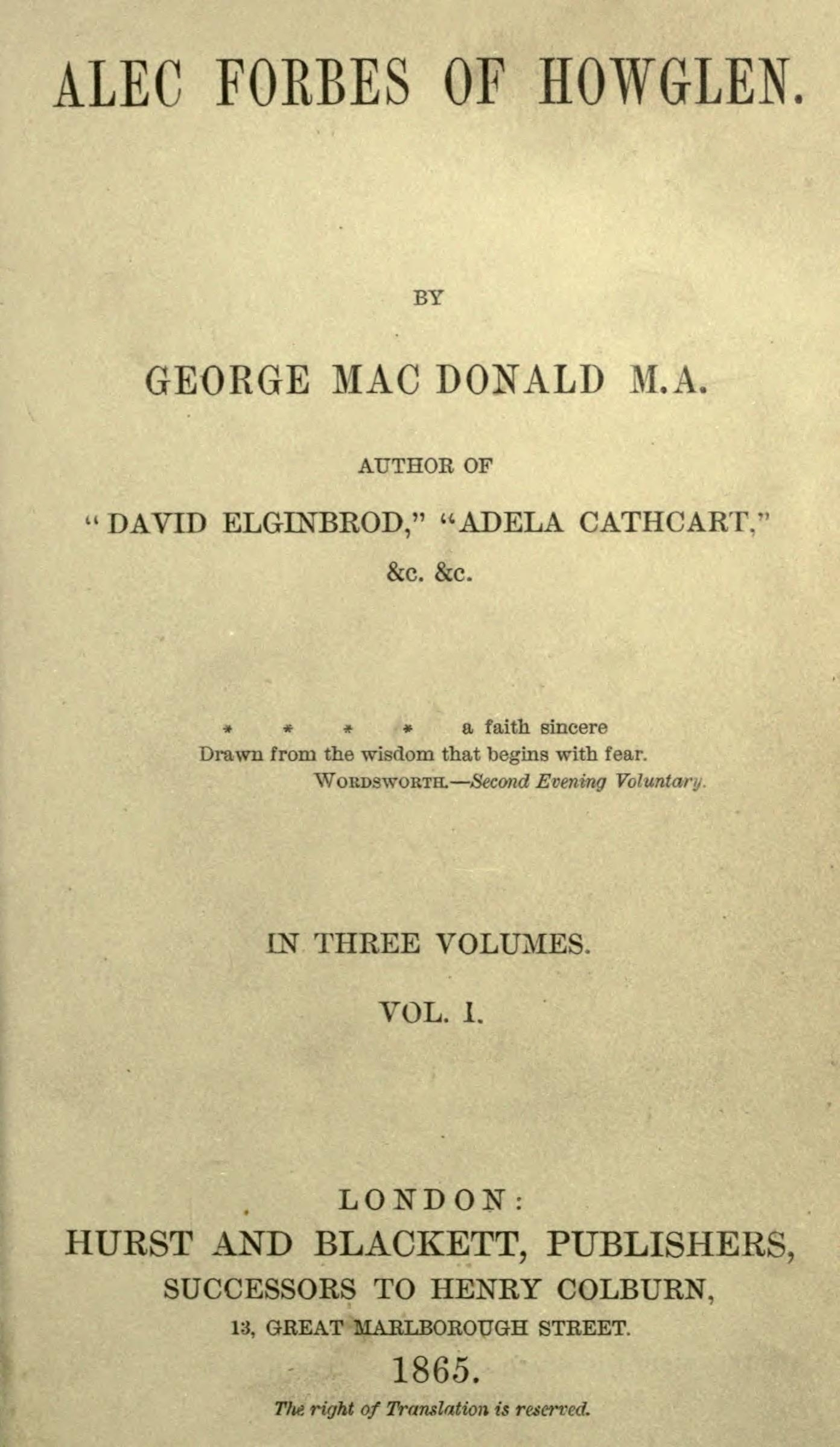
First edition title page

Alec Forbes of Howglen is a novel by George MacDonald, first published in 1865 by Hurst and Blackett, and is primarily concerned with Scottish country life.

== Synopsis ==
The "Howglen" described in the novel is probably a reference to George MacDonald's childhood home in Huntly, Scotland, "The Farm". The "Glamour" river, on which the town of the novel is situated, has been immortalized in the names of modern-day streets in Huntly, as well as in a children's park near the site of the old MacDonald family mill.

Much of the original novel is written in Doric, a dialect of North East Scotland. A subsequent edition "translates into readable English the heaviest portions of the Scots dialect in which most of MacDonald’s Scottish stories are written".'

== Literary significance and criticism ==
1. No account of this story would give any idea of the profound interest that pervades the work from the first page to the last. —Athenæum
2. A novel of uncommon merit, Sir Walter Scott said he would advise no man to try to read 'Clarissa Harlowe' out loud in company if he wished to keep his character for manly superiority to tears. We fancy a good many hardened old novel-readers will feel a rising in the throat as they follow the fortunes of Alec and Annie. -Pall Mall Gazette.
3. This book is full of good thought and good writing. Dr. Mac Donald looks in his stories more to the souls of men and women than to their social outside. He reads life and nature like a true poet. —Examiner
4. The whole story is one of surpassing excellence and beauty." —Daily News
5. Alec Forbes...is very enjoyable, and the character of Annie Anderson is one of the most delightful I have ever met with in fiction. —Charles Lutwidge Dodgson
