= Mary Marston =

1881 novel by George MacDonald

A Daughter's Devotion
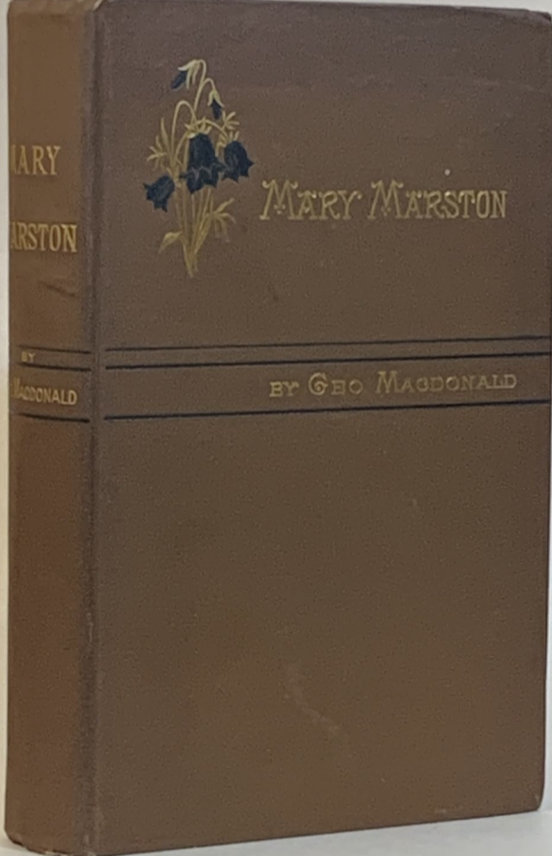
- Author: George MacDonald
- Language: English
- Publisher: Sampson Low Publishers, London
- Publication date: 1881
- Publication place: United Kingdom
- Preceded by: A Book of Strife, in the Form of the Diary of an Old Soul
- Followed by: Warlock O' Glenwarlock

Mary Marston is a novel by George MacDonald. It was written in 1881 and later republished as A Daughter's Devotion.

The story centres around the life of a simple merchant's daughter, the titular Mary Marston. Her unswerving commitment to love God and others is contrasted with a backdrop of an array of characters and a complex and sometimes mysterious plot. It is a religious, moral tale of a woman who loves a man and teaches him to change, not out of his love for her but simply because it is the right thing to do.

The novel was written at the height of George MacDonald's literary career. MacDonald’s portrayal of the characters ranges from delightful to devious. As such, he intended them to serve as models to readers. His message is that all eventually must stand before God, reckoning with the complicated boundaries of social class and the hypocrisy of those who call themselves Christians.

== Modern edition ==
- A Daughter’s Devotion, Michael R. Phillips, editor. Minneapolis, Minn.: Bethany House Publishers, c1988. ISBN 0-8712-3906-X
