= Good Words =

19th-century monthly periodical established in Scotland

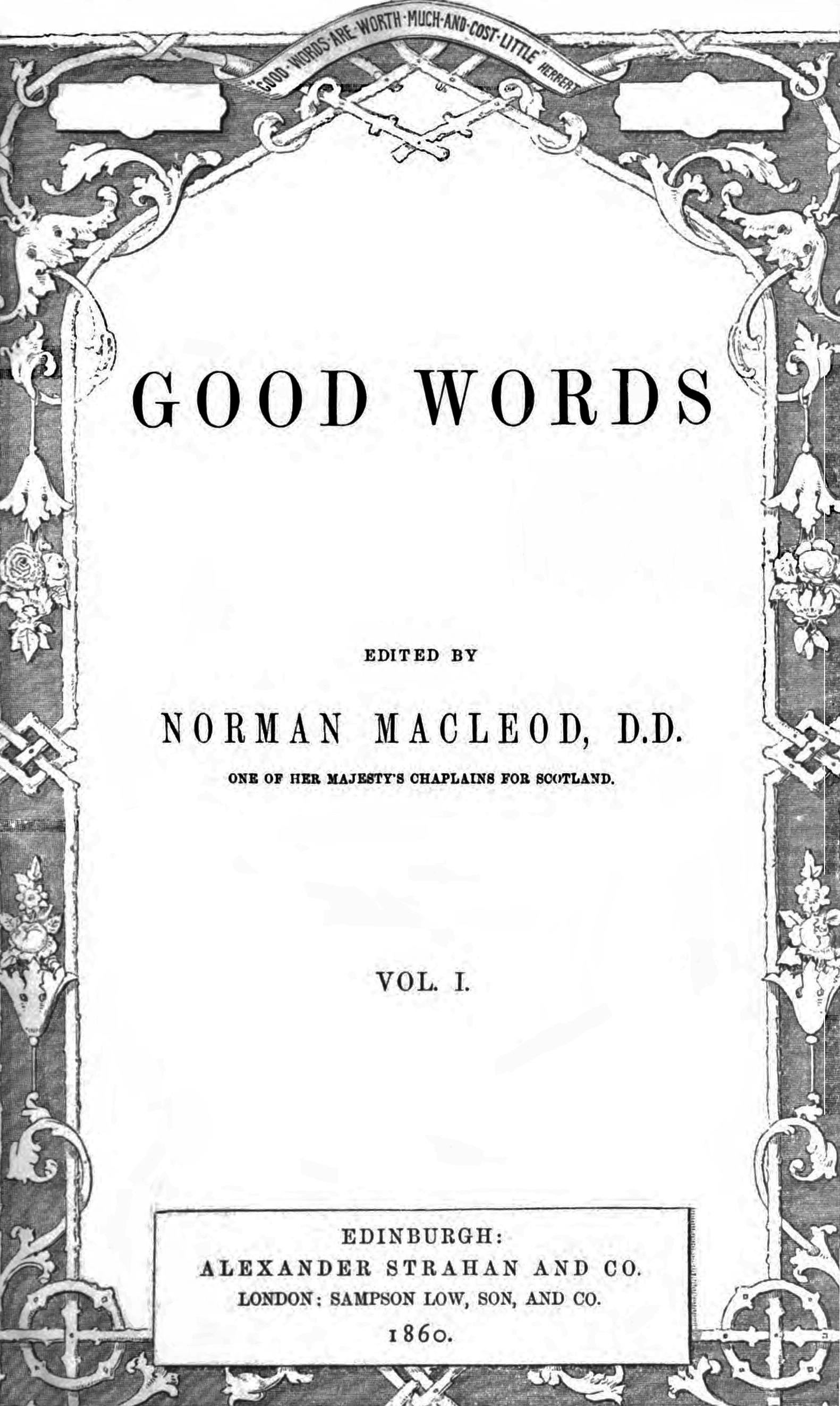
- Vol 1 title page, 1860.
- Editor: Norman Macleod
- Frequency: Monthly
- Founded: 1860
- Final issue: 1910
- Language: English

Good Words was a 19th-century monthly periodical established in Scotland in 1860 by the Scottish publisher Alexander Strahan. Its first editor was Norman Macleod. After his death in 1872, it was edited by his brother, Donald Macleod, though there is some evidence that the publishing was taken over at that time by W. Isbister & Co.

== Intended readership and content ==
Good Words was directed at evangelicals and nonconformists, particularly of the lower middle classes. It included overtly religious material, but also fiction and non-fiction articles on general subjects, including science. The standard for content was that the devout should be able to read it on Sundays without sin. It became known as a "fireside read", which could be shared and enjoyed by adults, servants and masters.

Good Words was known for illustrations by such artists as John Everett Millais and Arthur Boyd Houghton, engraved by the Brothers Dalziel. Francis Arthur Fraser had nearly 200 illustrations published by 1871.

== Circulation ==
In 1863, Norman Macleod wrote that the magazine had a circulation of 70,000. In the following year, it advertised a monthly circulation of 160,000, but the number is probably exaggerated.

In 1906, Good Words was amalgamated with the weekly Sunday Magazine, and published in that format until 1910.

== See also ==
- Good Words for the Young
