= Ranald Bannerman's Boyhood =

1871 novel by George MacDonald

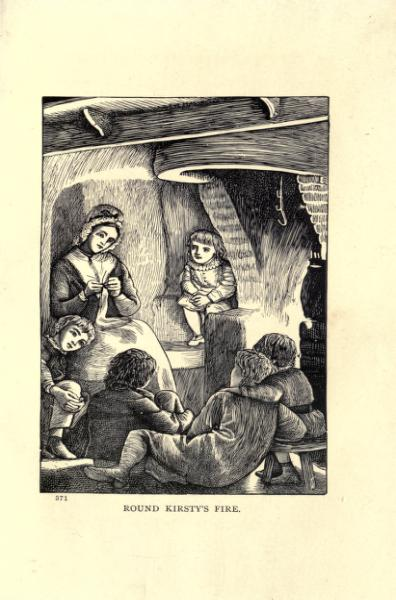
- "Round Kirsty's Fire" (p. 57)
- Author: George MacDonald
- Illustrator: Arthur Hughes
- Cover artist: Laurence Housman
- Language: English
- Publisher: Strahan & Co., Publishers
- Publication date: 1871
- Publication place: United Kingdom

Ranald Bannerman's Boyhood is a realistic, largely autobiographical, novel by George MacDonald. It was first published in 1871. The original edition was illustrated by Arthur Hughes.

== Plot introduction ==
Ranald Bannerman's Boyhood is a story of a young motherless boy growing up with his brothers in a Scottish manse. The list of characters includes the wicked, sneaking housekeeper, Mrs. Mitchel; Kirsty, an enchanting Highland storyteller; Turkey, the intrepid cowherd; the strange Wandering Willie; the evil Kelpie; the sweet horse Missie; and the lovely Elsie Duff. Throughout the twists and turns of his escapades and adventures, Ranald learns from his father the important lessons of courage and integrity.

== Literary significance and criticism ==
The New York Independent in 1871 characterized the book as "full of sweetness, full of boy-life and true goodness". The Boston Post also praised the book, saying, "Mr. Macdonald writes of youthful experiences in a way unequaled by any other author of the day, and this volume is in his best style."
