= G. H. Evison =

Artist and book illustrator (1871–1928)

George Henry Evison
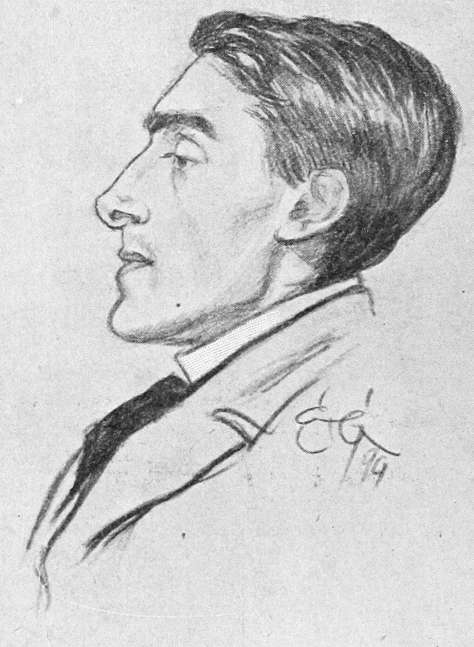
- G H Evison in 1899
- Born: 25 November 1871; Bootle, Lancashire, England
- Died: 1928 (aged 56–57); Harrow, England
- Other names: Signed as G . H. Evison or Henry Evison
- Occupations: Artist and Book Illustrator
- Years active: 1890–1925
- Known for: Illustrating the Daily Mail's Sixpenny Novels

George Henry Evison (25 November 1871 – 1928) was a Lancastrian artist and book illustrator who illustrated many cheaper books with his strong line drawings. He illustrated magazines with both line drawings and colour wash drawings.

== Early life ==
Evison was born on 25 November 1871 in Bootle, Lancashire. He was the second child of William Flinn Evison (baptised 24 May 1831 – October 1872), (Note: Evison's father was buried on 16 October 1872. His death was registered in the fourth quarter of 1872, suggesting that he died in October) a clerk for the Liverpool and America shipping trade, and Sarah Ellen Emson (born third quarter 1845), the daughter of a publican. His parents married on 28 May 1867 at St Simon's Parish in Liverpool. Evison's elder sister Lillie (c. 1870 – 25 December 1871) (Note: While Lillie's birth was only registered in the first quarter of 1870, there are several hints that she was born in the last quarter of 1869, including her age at death.) died shortly after he was born. Evison's father died the following year, before Evison's first birthday.

== Training ==
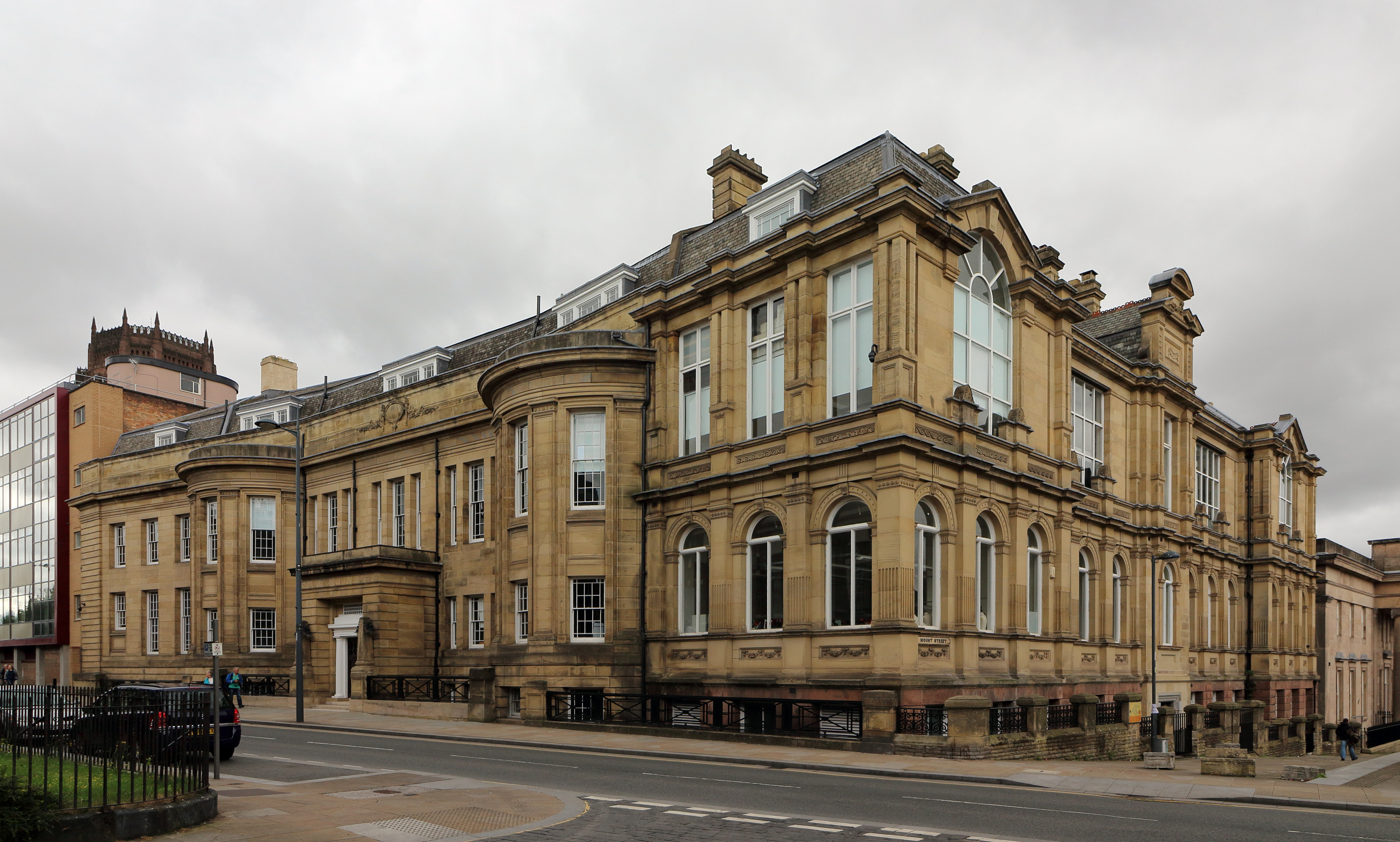
The former Liverpool School of Art

Evison began his career with a five-year apprenticeship to a lithographic artist in Liverpool, while attending evening classes at the Liverpool School of Art. Typically, apprenticeships began at 14 or 15, and Evison would have been fourteen in November 1885. He attended the Liverpool School of Art (Note: This was the first purpose built art school outside of London, having opened in 1883. After serving under various names as a school of art until 2008, it was purchased by the Liverpool Institute for Performing Arts to expand their teaching space in 2012.) He was attending the school in September 1888 when he was awarded a small class prize (7s. 6d.) for attendance and success in exams.

However, at the end of his apprenticeship (c. 1890), he was not satisfied with lithography, and gave it up in favour of pen and ink. He studied pen and ink drawing full-time under John Finnie (Note: The Poster spells his name Finne rather than Finnie. He was the headmaster of the Liverpool School of Art until his retirement in 1896.) at the Liverpool School of Art, where he won a scholarship worth £60.

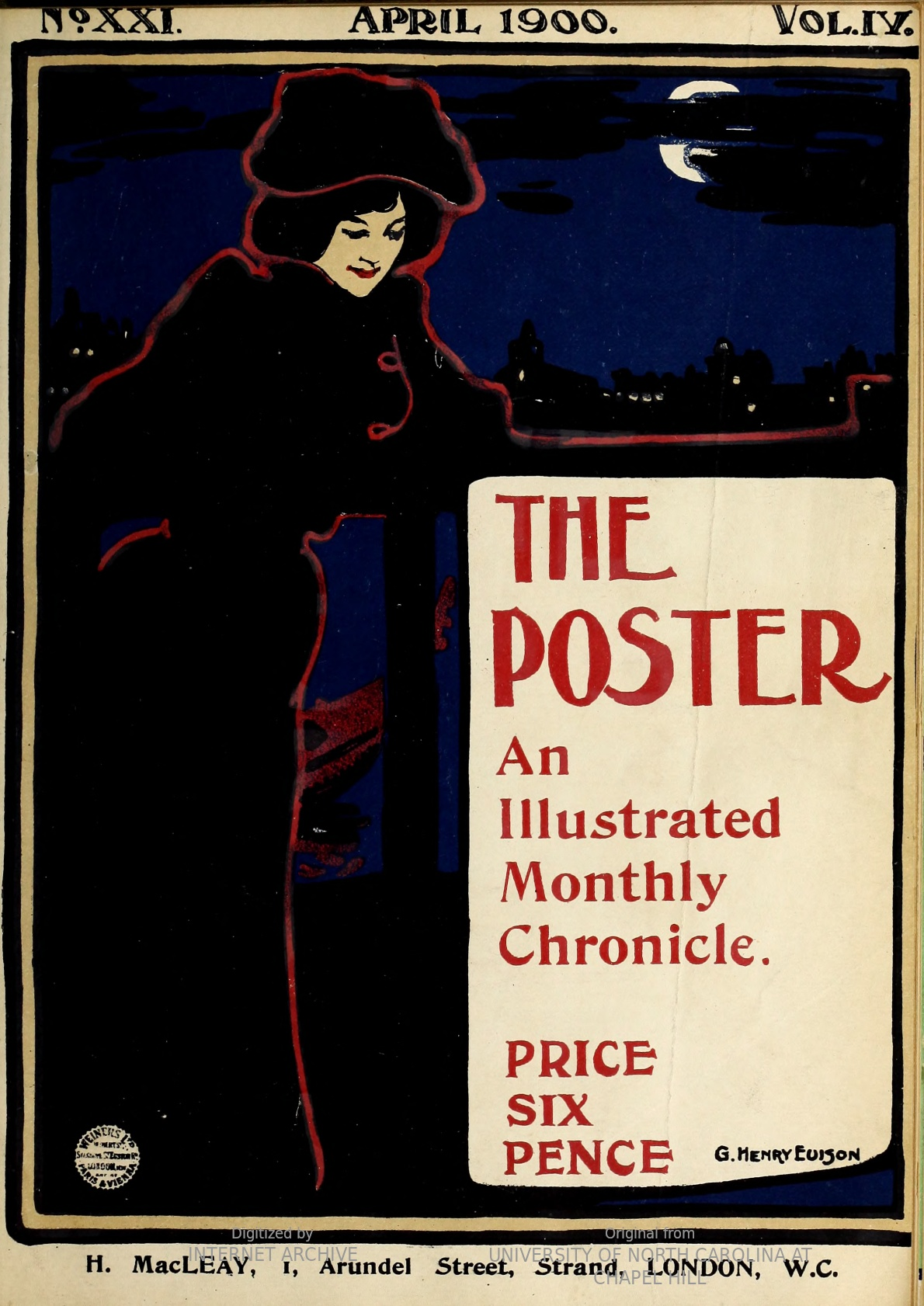
Front Cover for The Poster for April 1900

He had already begun to have some drawings accepted by Magazines like Pick-me-up or Judy and this success led to him coming to London and joining the Slade School where he worked for 12 months. His April 1900 profile in The Poster and his cover illustration for that month indicate that he had found acceptance in London.

== Exhibiting ==
Evison exhibited seven times at the Walker Gallery in Liverpool and four times at the Royal Academy. His pieces at the Royal Academy were story illustrations in at least two cases. At least one of his works shown at the Walker Gallery resulted in a sale, Tea-Time sold for £10 in 1894.

== Magazine illustration ==
Initially Evison appears to have concentrated on magazine illustration. He contributed illustrations to a wide range of magazines including:

- Judy (Note: This was an illustrated weekly comic and social magazine the cost two pence. It had a circulation of 40,000 and ran from 1867 to 1907.)
- The English Illustrated Magazine
- The Idler
- The Poster
- The Wide World Magazine
- The Strand Magazine
- The Bystander
- To-day, where he had already illustrated two serials for Barry Pain by 1900. (Note: This version of To-day was a weekly magazine that ran from 11 November 1893 to 19 July 1905, and was then incorporated with London Opinion. It cost 2d. and had a circulation of 40,000.)

The Poster reported that by 1900 Evison had already worked for four of the Newnes publications (Note: George Newnes published a wide range of publications including The Strand Magazine, Tit-Bits (with a circular of the order of half a million at the time), Country Life, Under the Union Jack, Wide World Magazine, The Captain (a boys' paper), and the Traveller) and four of Pearson's publications (Note: C. Arthur Pearson had a range of publications, the most popular of which was Pearson's Magazine a monthly with a circulation of over 200,000, but the circulation of publications such as Home Notes could be nearly as high.) as well as other magazines.

=== Example of pen and ink magazine illustration ===
Evison was a regular illustrator for George Newnes' Wide World Magazine. He did approximately two dozen illustrations for From Job to Job Around the World by Alfred C. B. Fletcher in Wide World Magazine Volume 37, May–October 1916. The serial story covers the adventures of two young Americans who set out from San Francisco to travel around the world with only $10 between them.

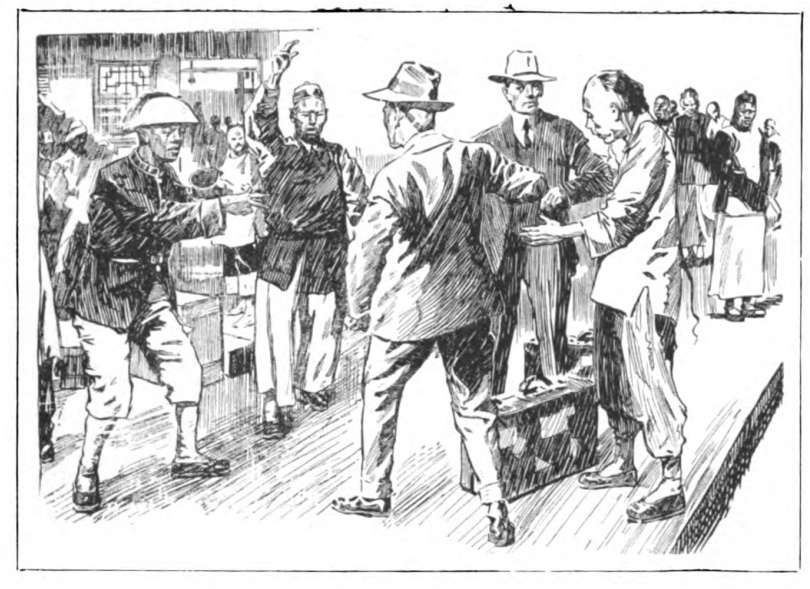
Page-066

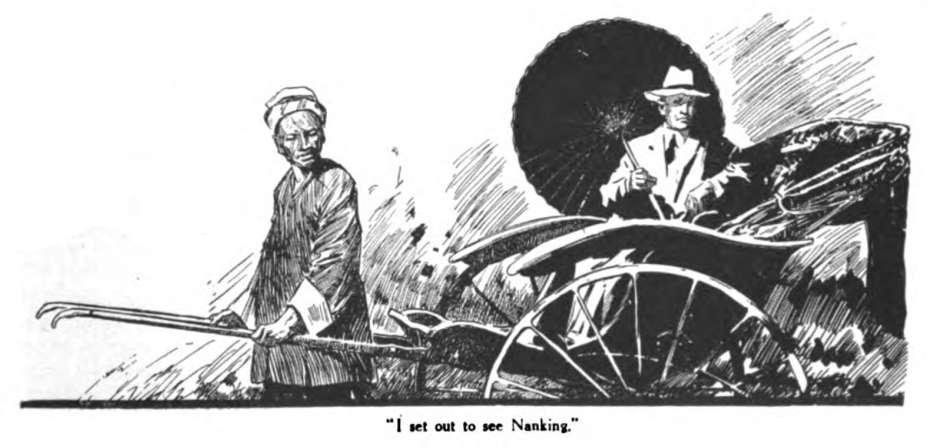
Page-069

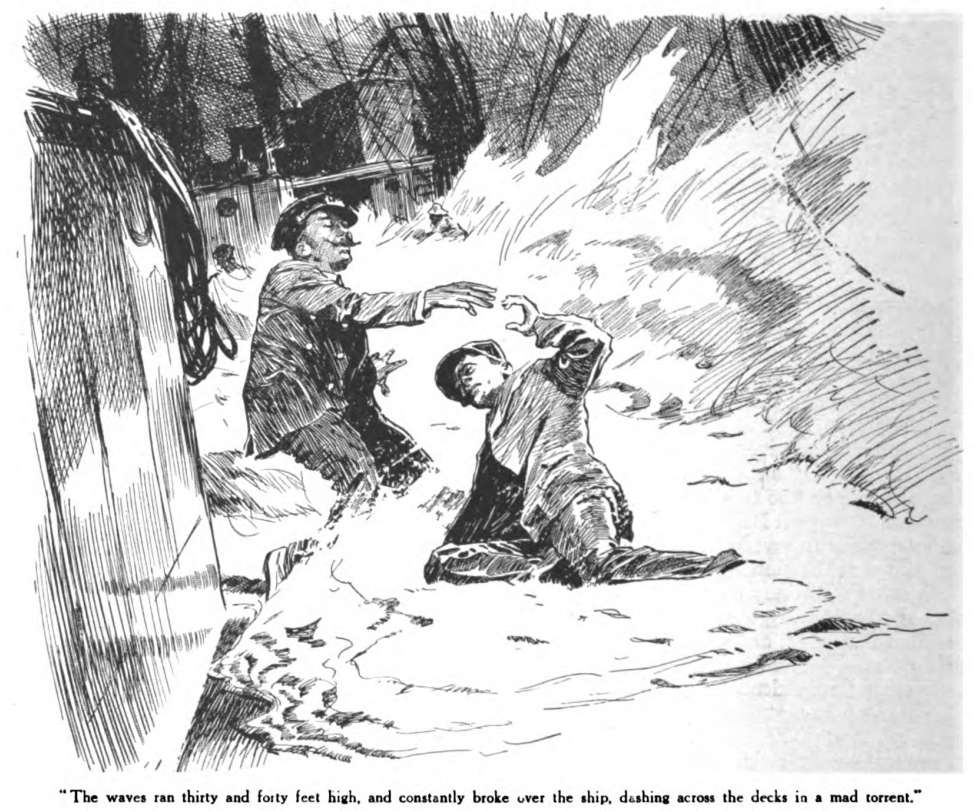
Page-072

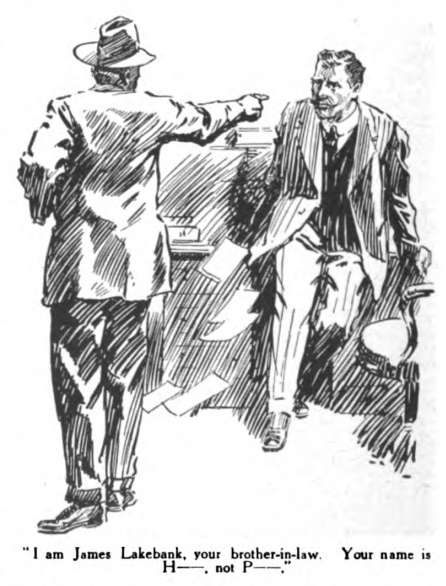
Page-114

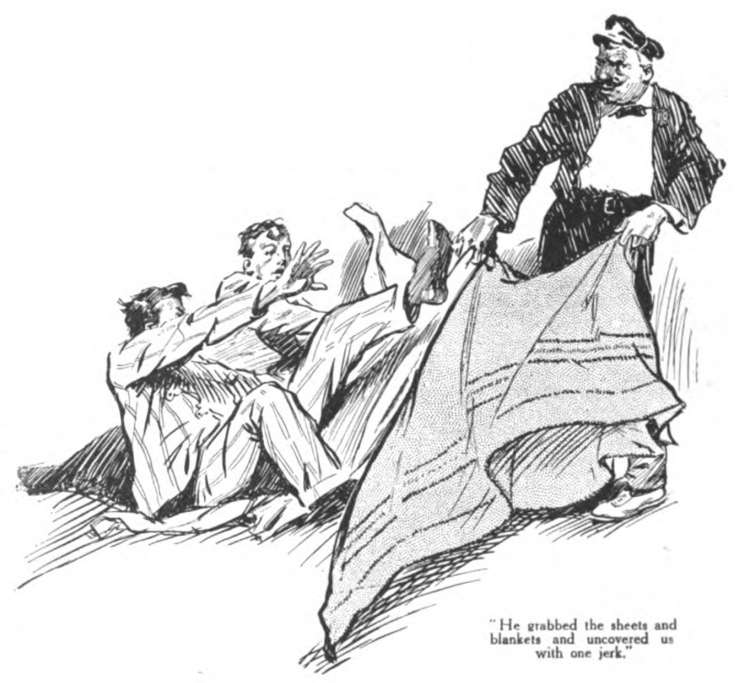
Page-117

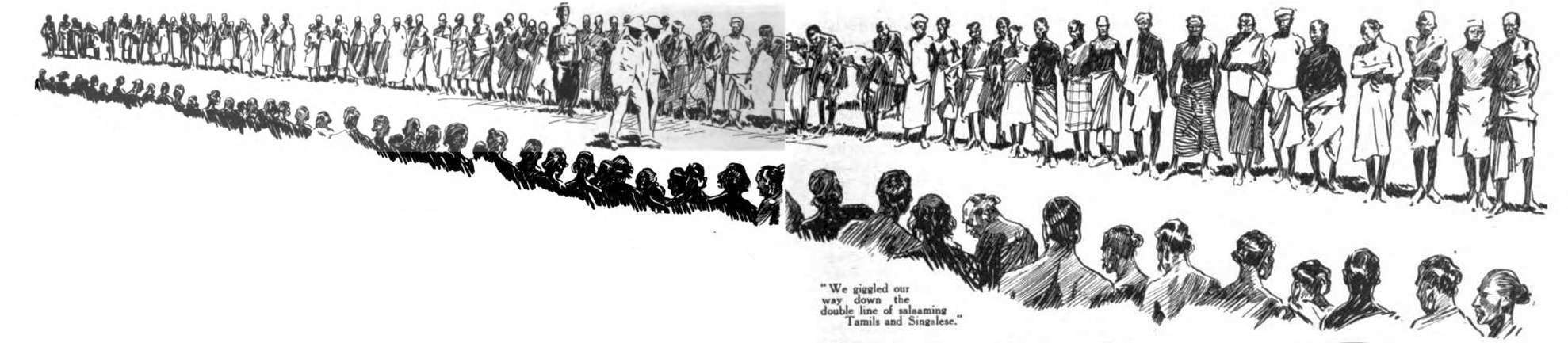
Page-118

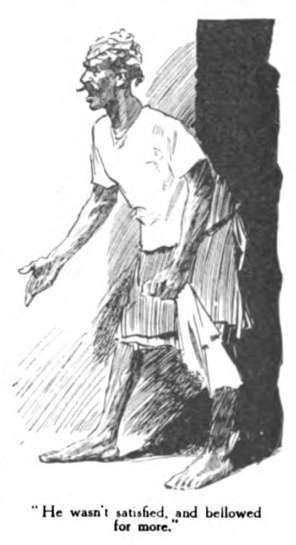
Page-121

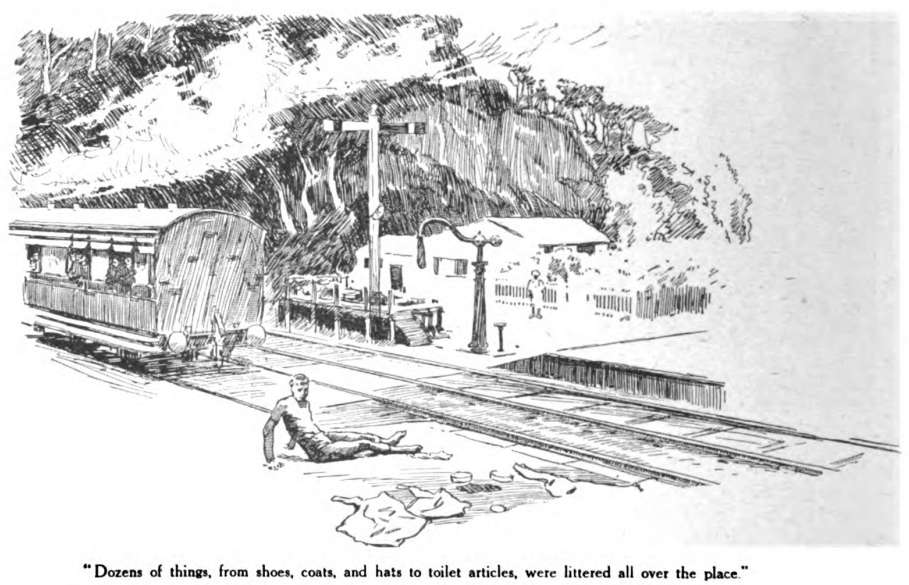
Page-260

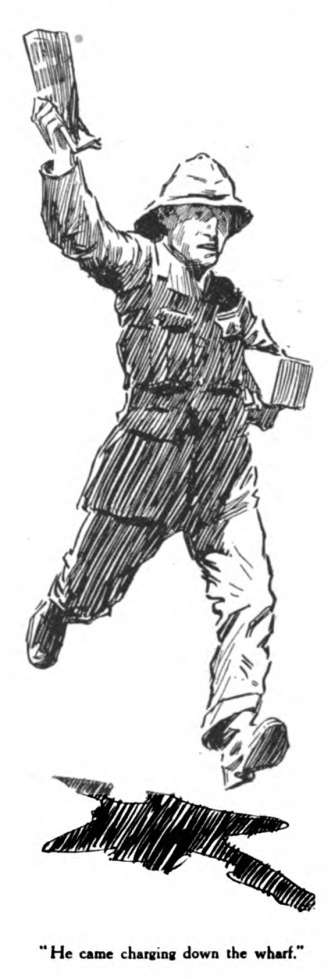
Page-263

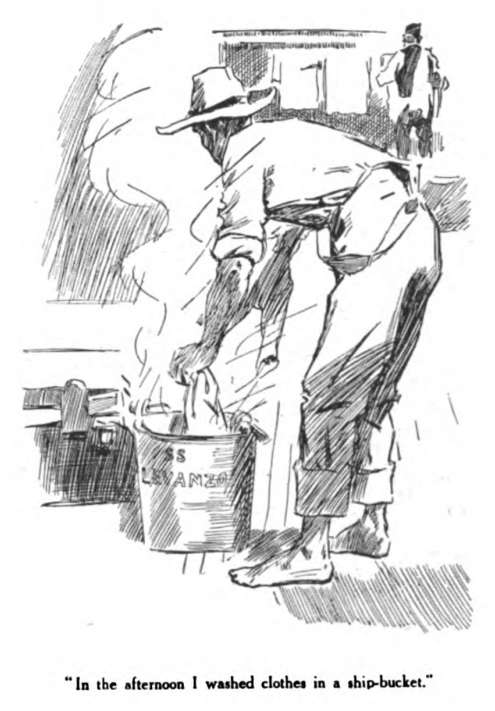
Page-265

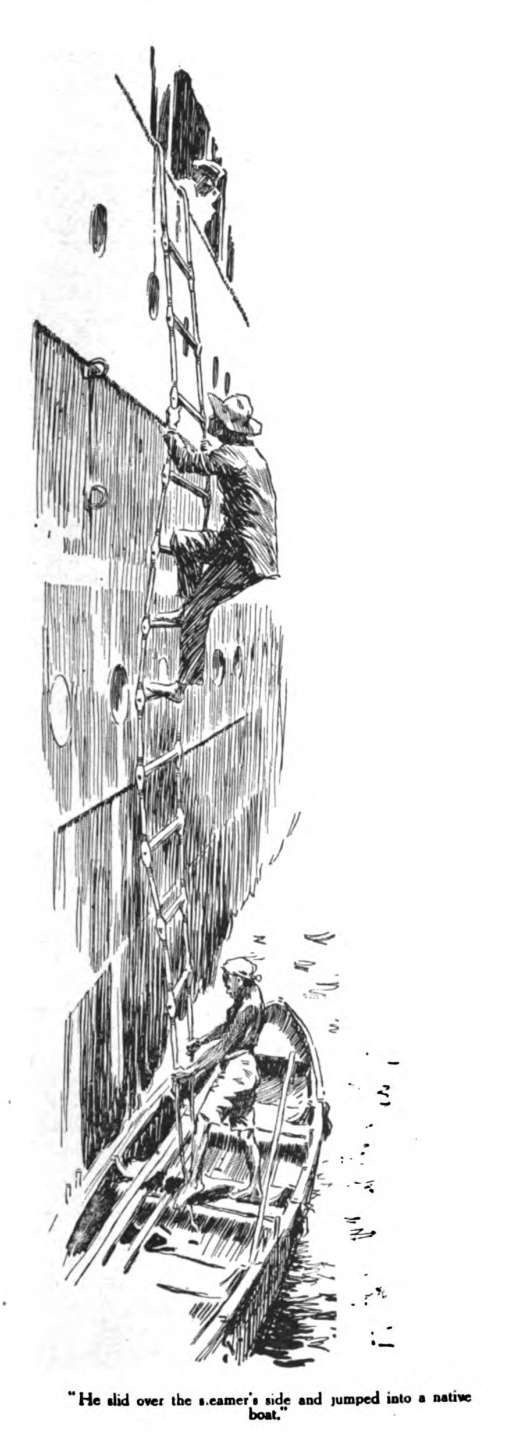
Page-333

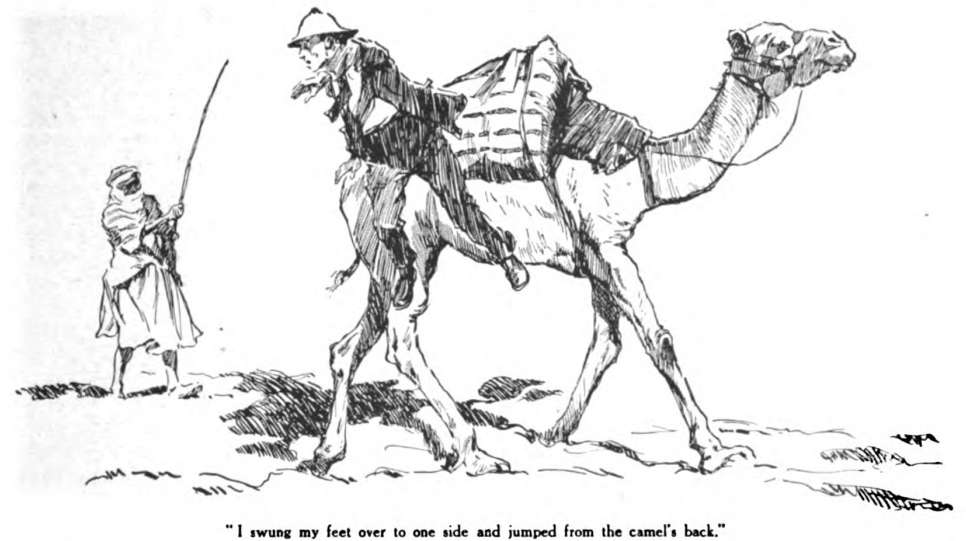
Page-335

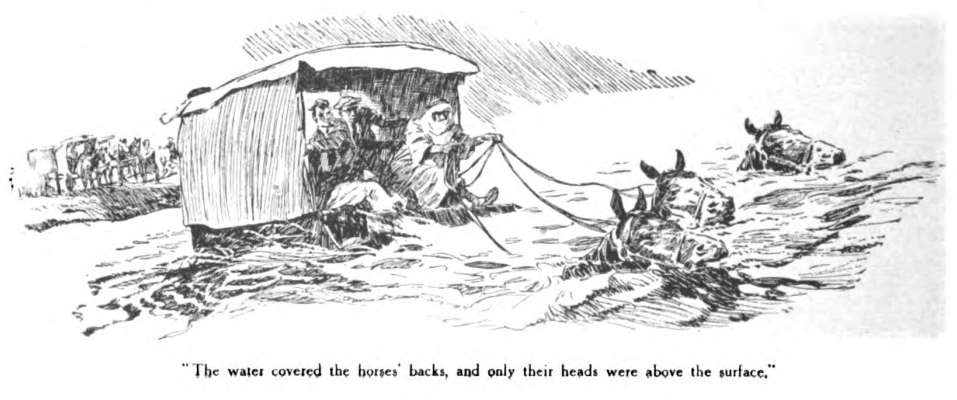
Page-336

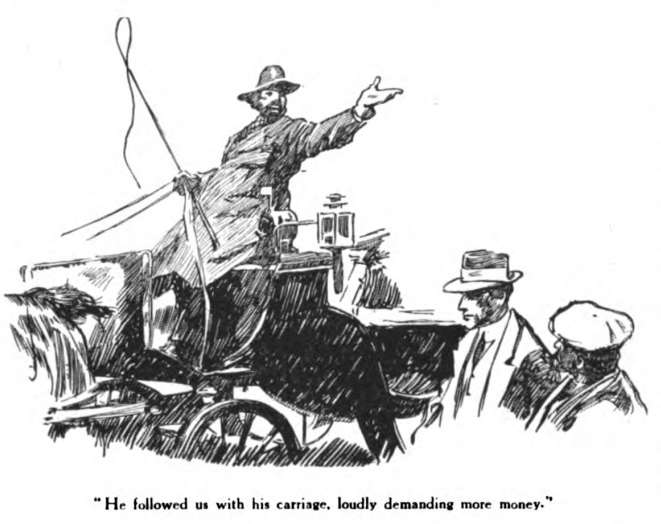
Page-460

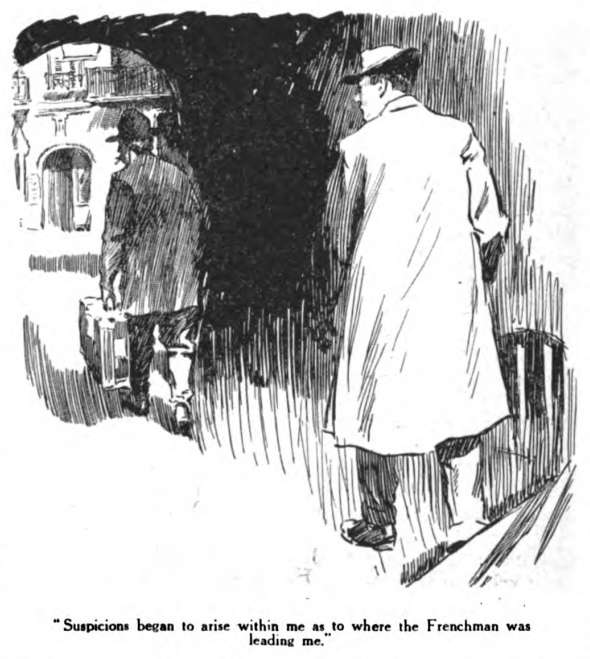
Page-462

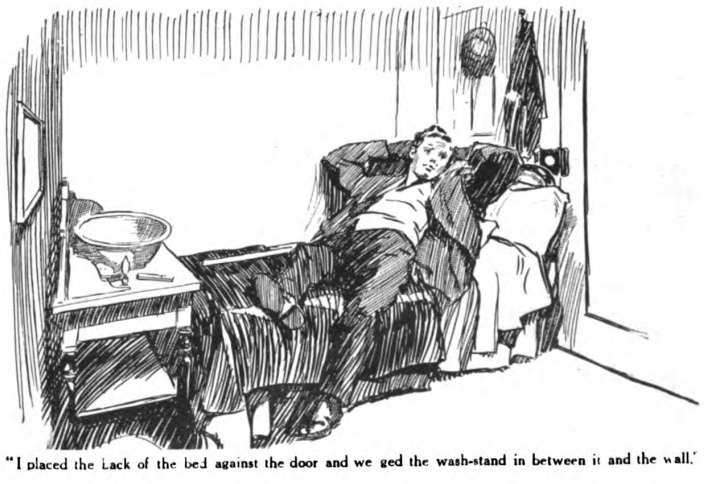
Page-463

== Book illustration ==
Evison seems to have made a slow start at book illustration. It was only at the end of the first decade of the 20th century that he began to illustrate any significant number of books, and this grew to a flood with his illustrations of the Daily Mail sixpenny novels.

The following list of books illustrated by Evison is far from complete. The principle sources are searches of the Jisc catalogue, (Note: The Jisc Library Hub Discover brings together the catalogues of 165 Major UK and Irish libraries.) Additional libraries are being added all the time, and the catalogue collates national, university, and research libraries. and the page about Evison on the Charles Pearce Project. (Note: Charles E. Pearch (1843–1924) was a prolific English author of juvenile fiction, crime fiction, biographies and journalism.)

Partial list of books illustrated by Evison
No	Author	Year	Title	Publisher	Pages	Notes
1	George MacDonald	1893	A dish of orts: chiefly papers on the imagination, and on Shakspere [sic], Enlarged Edition	London, Sampson Low and Company	vi, 322 p., 8º	(Note: With Cyrus Cuneo)
2	George Humphery	1900	The haunted room : a phantasmal phantasy	Sands & Co., London	217 p., 7 pl., 8º	
3	Eric Lisle	1907	Under Honour's Flag	London, Frederick Warne & Co	vi, 312 p., 8 illus., 8º	(Note: Available online at Project Gutenberg.)
4	George MacDonald	1908	Guild Court	London, Edwin Dalton	iv, 331p, illus.	(Note: With Cyrus Cuneo. Available online at the HathiTrust.)
5	George MacDonald	1908	Stephen Archer	London, Edwin Dalton	354 p., Illus.	(Note: With Cyrus Cuneo. Available online at the HathiTrust.)
6	Herbert Escott Inman	1908	The Mill-Lass of Idderleigh	London, Frederick Warne & Co	vi. 424 p., 8º	
7	George MacDonald	1908	The vicar's daughter : an autobiographical story	London, Sampson Low and Company	vii,375p., 3pl. 8º	(Note: With Cyrus Cuneo.)
8	George Mac Donald	1908	Weighed and wanting	London, Edwin Dalton	iv, 379 p., fs., 8º	(Note: With Cyrus Cuneo.)
9	Stella. M. Düring	1910	Malicious Fortune	London, Amalgamated Press	vi. 154 p., 8º	(Note: Daily Mail Sixpenny Novel. no. 108.)
10	C. Ranger Gull	1910	Retribution	London, Amalgamated Press	vi. 150 p., 8º	(Note: Daily Mail Sixpenny Novel. no. 116.)
11	May Wynne	1911	Phil’s Cousins	London, Blackie		
12	Effie Adelaide Rowlands	1911	For Ever and a Day	London, Amalgamated Press	136 p., 8º	(Note: Daily Mail Sixpenny Novel. no. 149.)
13	Marie Connor Leighton and Robert Leighton	1911	In the Shadow of Guilt. A novel	London, Amalgamated Press	vi. 178 p., 8º	(Note: Daily Mail Sixpenny Novel. no. 136.)
14	Effie Adelaide Rowlands	1911	Leila Vane's Burden	London, Amalgamated Press	138 p., 8º	(Note: Daily Mail Sixpenny Novel.)
15	Stanley Portal Hyatt	1911	The Little Brown Brother	London, Amalgamated Press	vi. 142 p., 8º	(Note: Daily Mail Sixpenny Novel. No. 141.)
16	William Le Queux	1911	Treasure of Israel	London, Amalgamated Press	124 p., 8º	(Note: Daily Mail Sixpenny Novel. No. 148.)
17	Meredith Nicholson	1912	The Port of Missing Men	London, Amalgamated Press	vi. 138 p., 8º	(Note: Daily Mail Sixpenny Novel. no. 166.)
18	Maurice Drake	1912	The Salving of a Derelict	London, Amalgamated Press	vi. 112 p.	(Note: Daily Mail Sixpenny Novel.)
19	David Graham Phillips	1912	The Second Generation	London, Amalgamated Press	vi. 158 p., 8º	(Note: Daily Mail Sixpenny Novel. no. 161.)
20	Mary E. Mann	1912	The Sheep & the Goats	London, Amalgamated Press	vi. 136 p., 8º	(Note: Daily Mail Sixpenny Novel. no. 160.)
21	Annie S. Swan	1913	The Farrants: a story of struggle and victory	London, Charles H. Kelly	352 p., illus., 8º	
22	Herbert Escott Inman	1913	Nancy Lee, Mill Lass	London, Frederick Warne	416, 4pl., 8º	
23	Herbert Strang	1917	Carry On! A Story of the Fight for Bagdad	London, Humphrey Milford, OUP	277 p., 8º	(Note: Available online at Project Gutenberg.)
24	John Lea	1920	Fights for Freedom – thrilling stories of heroic deeds in the Great War	London, The Epworth Press	Illus.	
25	T. C. Bridges	1920	Martin Crusoe: a boy’s adventure on Wizard Island	London, George G. Harrap	Col fs., pl., 8º	
26	Charles Dickens	1920	The Adventures of Oliver Twist [The Newberry Classics]	London, David McKay	Col fs., 4 b&w pl., 8º	
27	George Forbes	1920	Adventures in Southern Seas : a tale of the sixteenth century	London, George G. Harrap & Co.	251 p., 8º	(Note: The catalogue entry describes the author as Professor of Natural Philosophy in the Andersonian University Glasgow)
28	T. C. Bridges	1921	The sky riders : a stirring tale of adventure round the world	London, George G. Harrap & Co.	192 p., col fs., 4 b&w pl., 8º	
29	T. C. Bridges	1923	Men of the Mist	London, George G. Harrap & Co.	4 pl.	
30	T. C. Bridges	1926	The Book of Discovery	London, George G. Harrap & Co.	Col fs., 4 b&w pl.	
31	John G. Rowe	1926	The Island Mine: a tale of adventure in tropic seas	London, The Epworth Press	Col. fs.	
32	Mona Tracy	1927	Rifle and Tomahawk: a stirring tale of the Te Kooti Rebellion	London, George G. Harrap	Col fs., 4 b&w pl.	(Note: The Auckland Star commented that Evison's illustrations, though helping the story, would be more effective if they depicted more of what is characteristic in New Zealand scenery.)
33	Various	1927	The Lucky Boys’ Budget	London, Blackie & Son.		
34	Mona Tracy	1928	Lawless Days: a tale of adventure in Old New Zealand and other South Seas	London, George Harrap & Co.	Col fs., illus.	
35	R. J. McGregor	1928	The Secret Jungle	London, The Sheldon Press	160 p., 8º	(Note: The Sheldon Press was an imprint of the Society for Promoting Christian Knowledge until 2019.)
36	Herbert Strang (ed.)	1934	The Great Book for Boys	London, Humphrey Milford, OUP		
37	T. C. Bridges	1934	Recent Heroes of Modern Adventure	London, George G. Harrap & Co.	Fs.	
38	William M. Thayer	UD	From Log-Cabin to White House: Life of James A. Garfield	London, Epworth Press	Col fs., 4 b&w pl.	
39	Wingrove Willson (ed.)	UD	The World of Sport and Adventure	London, Aldine Publishing	Illus.	(Note: With Others)

=== Example of book illustrations ===
The following illustrations are not from the cheap editions which featured Evison's strong pen and ink drawings, but from a full-priced Christmas book. The book was Under Honour's Flag {Frederick Warne & Co., London, (1907) by Rev. Eric Lisle. (Note: The book centres on a boy from a difficult background whose heroic rescues from fire and water help to establish him in Public School. Kirkpatrick describes the book, as a throwback to the nineteenth century didactic school story, where the saving of a life is placed strongly in a religious and moral context.) Evison provide eight illustrations for the book, painted rather than in the pen and ink which he used for cheaper editions.

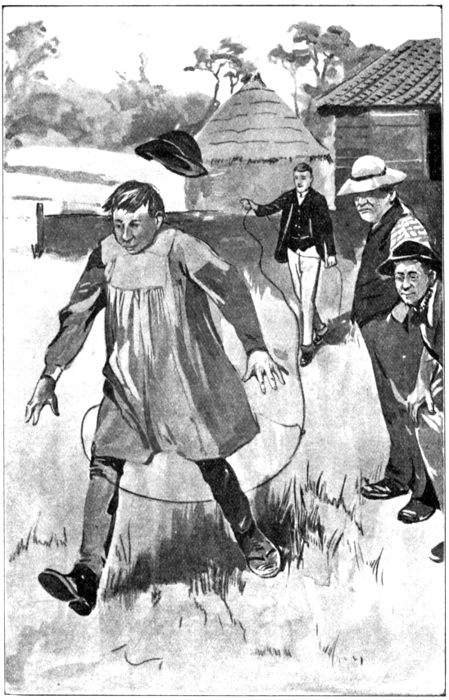
Page-007

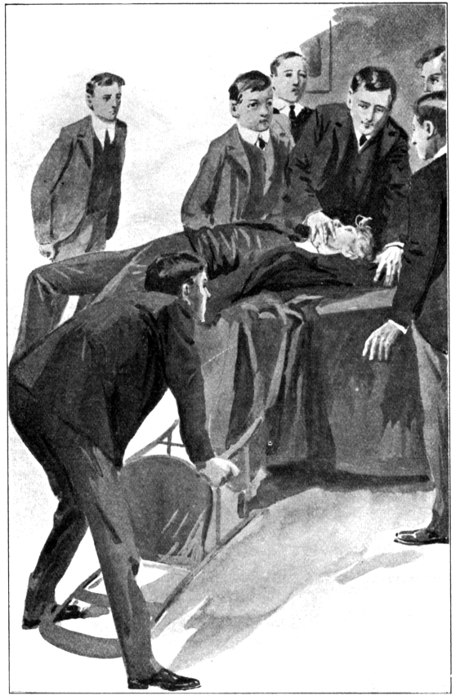
Page-049

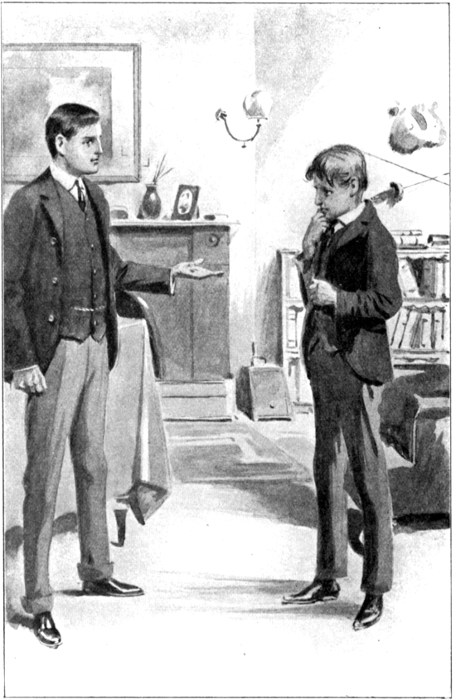
Page-110

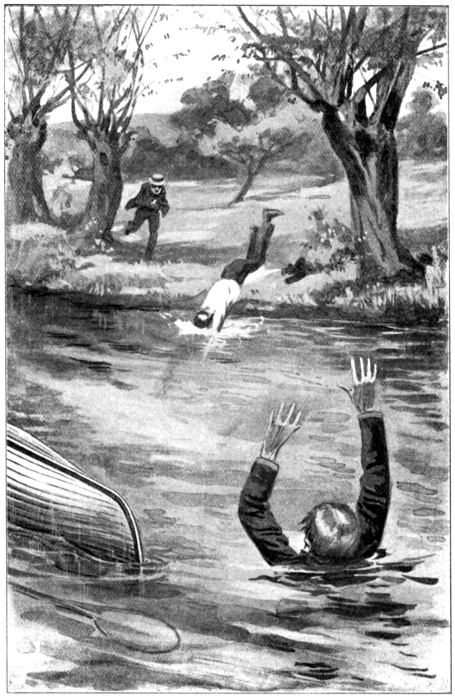
Page-138

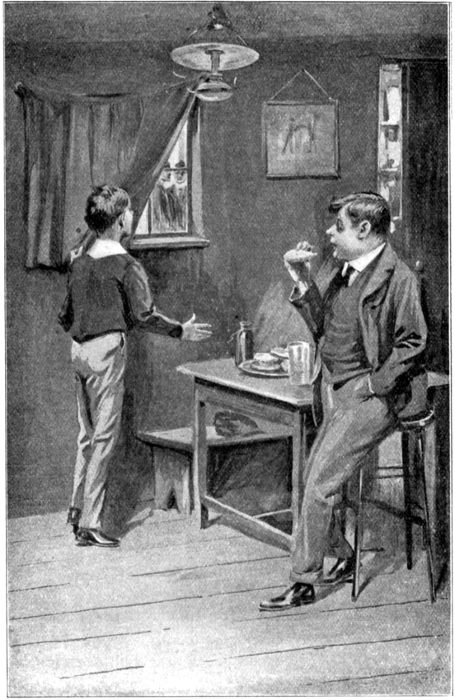
Page-172

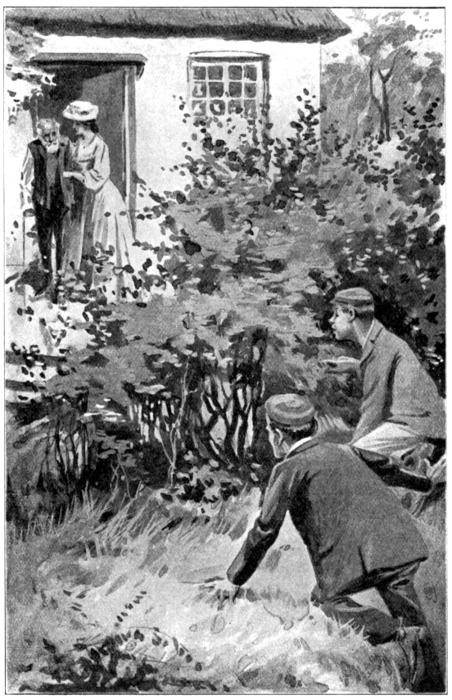
Page-230

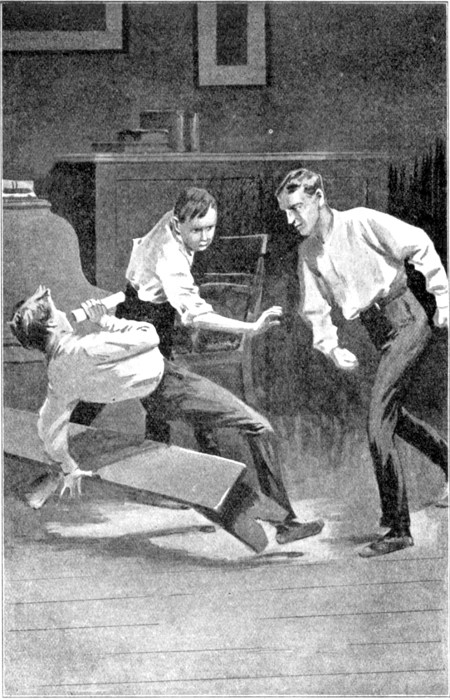
Page-257

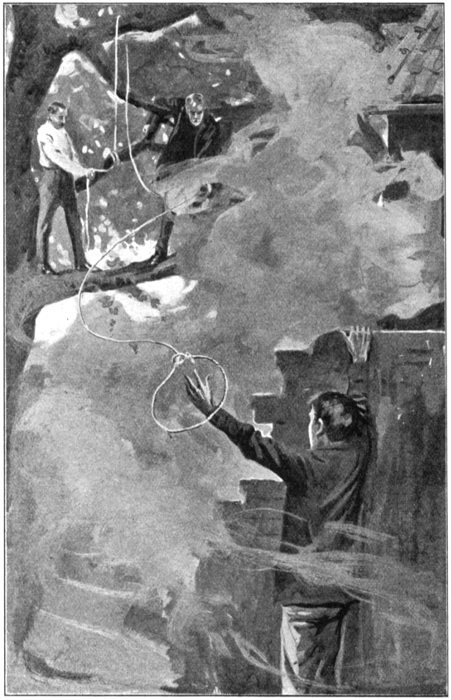
Page-287

== Death ==
Evison died in the second quarter of 1928, probably in early June. He was buried on 5 June 1928 at All Saints Cemetery in Harrow. At the time of his death, he was still living at his cousin's house at Fulwood, Royston Park, Pinner, where he had lived since at least 1905. He appears not to have left a will.

== Assessment ==
Houfe states that Evison was a particularly good figure artist and that he used pen and ink with heavy body colour.. Thorpe noted that his half-tone drawings in the English Illustrated Magazine were promising. A profound challenge for greater recognition of Evison is that a good deal of book illustration, at least, was for ephemeral editions such as the Daily Mail sixpenny editions. Such cheap editions uses cheap paper and only the boldest of pen and ink art reproduced well. Evison's bold pen and ink drawings were well suited to this constraint. His magazine illustrations covered a much broader range, and were not just restricted to pen and ink work.
