= David Elginbrod =

1863 novel by George MacDonald

- Author: George MacDonald
- Language: English
- Publisher: Hurst and Blackett
- Publication date: 1863
- Publication place: United Kingdom

David Elginbrod is an 1863 novel by George MacDonald. It is MacDonald's first realistic novel.

== Plot introduction ==
A novel of Scottish country life, in the dialect of Aberdeen.

A story of humble life, centering in two saintly personalities, a dignified and pious Scottish peasant, and his daughter. A vein of mysticism runs through the story, and mesmerism and electro-biology are introduced.

== Literary significance and criticism ==
1. A novel which is the work of a man of genius. It will attract the highest class of readers. —Times.
2. There are many beautiful passages and descriptions in this book. The characters are extremely well drawn. ——Athenæum.
3. A clever novel. The incidents are exciting, and the interest is maintained to the close. It may be doubted if Sir Walter Scott himself ever painted a Scotch fireside with more truth. —Morning Post.
4. David Elginbrod is the finest character we have met in fiction for many a day. The descriptions of natural scenery are vivid, truthful, and artistic; the general reflections are those of a refined, thoughtful, and poetical philosopher, and the whole moral atmosphere of the book la lofty, pure, and invigorating. —Globe.
