= Greville MacDonald =

from Reminiscences of a Specialist, 1932

Greville MacDonald (1856 in Bolton – 1944), was the son of influential fantasy writer George MacDonald and his wife Louisa (née Powell). He has provided some interesting insights into his father's life and circle of friends. Greville was a notable ear, nose and throat doctor. In later life Greville became involved in the Peasant Art movement in Haslemere.

== Biography ==
Greville is famous for having read Alice in Wonderland when "Uncle Dodgson" – Reverend Charles Dodgson, otherwise known as Lewis Carroll – was wondering whether to publish it. Louisa Powell MacDonald read the book to her children to gauge its worth if published, and Greville remembers his "braggart avowal that I wished there were 60,000 volumes of it". Carroll was uncertain of its potential for publication until he tried the manuscript with the MacDonald children and learned of the enthusiastic reception.

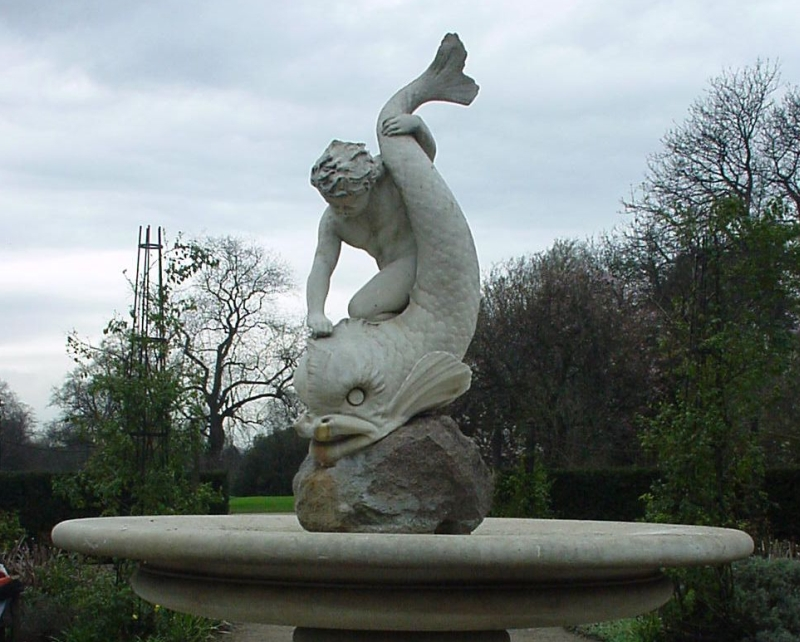
Boy with a Dolphin

Alex Munro used Greville as a model for his 1865 sculpture in Hyde Park of a boy with a dolphin. Greville attributes his understanding of Latin to Octavia Hill (who became a co-founder of the National Trust in 1895, along with Haslemere's Sir Robert Hunter) who joined the family on holiday in 1867 at Bude, and became a lifelong friend of Greville.

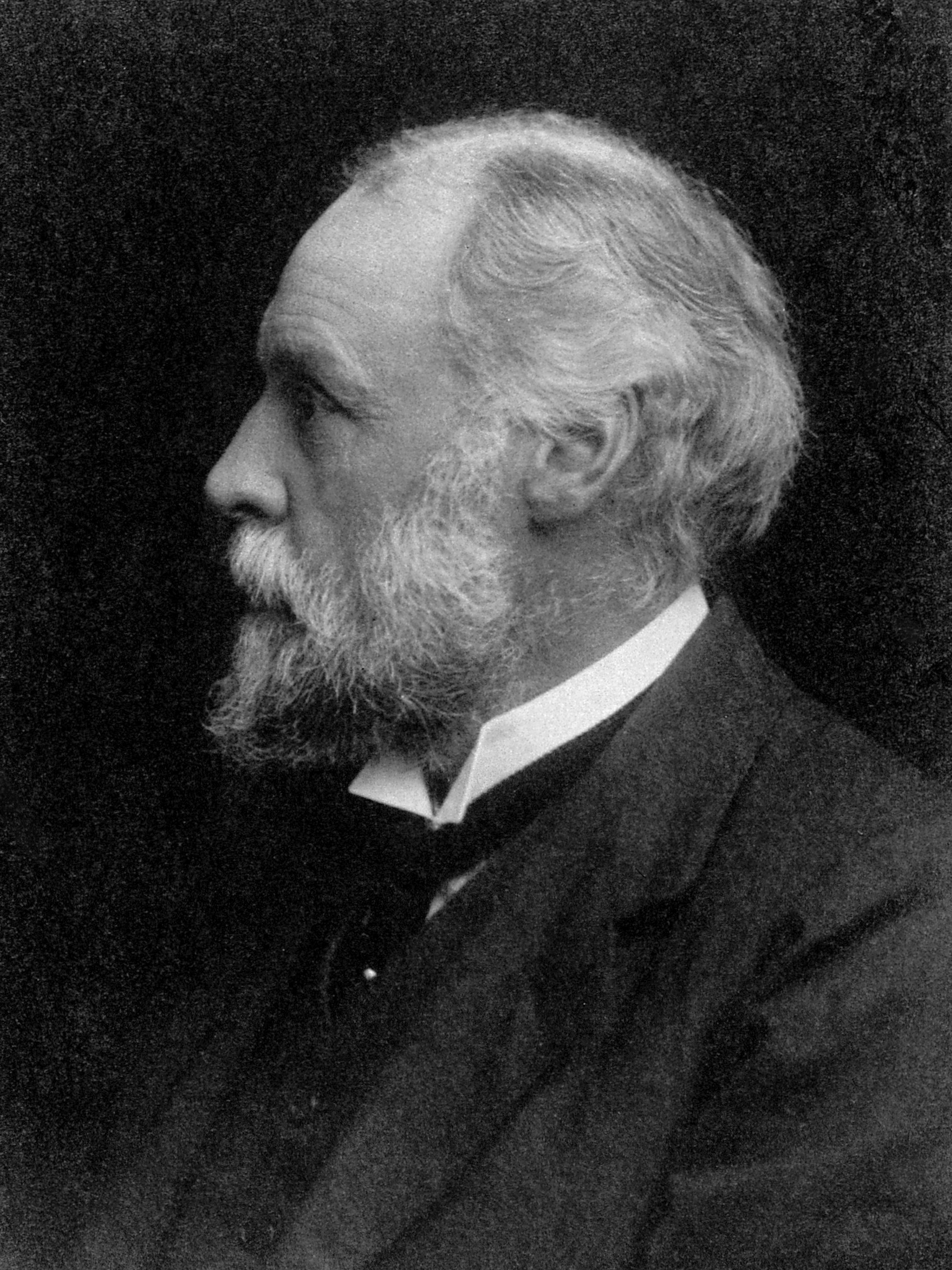
Greville MacDonald

Greville went to King's College School and then went to train at King's College Hospital. He briefly served as an assistant to Joseph Lister where his main responsibilities were to clean and sterilize surgical instruments. In 1885 MacDonald became Assistant Demonstrator of Anatomy at King's College. Despite suffering from partial deafness which degenerated with age, Greville became an ear, nose and throat doctor of some distinction, becoming President of the British Medical Association's nose division. He resided at 85 Harley Street and he retired from medical practice in 1904.

In 1919 he moved to Wildwood, Weydown Road, Haslemere. Greville's autobiography describes him as a "consulting physician to Kings College Hospital" and "Fellow and Emeritus Professor, King's College, London". Greville married his wife Elizabeth Phoebe Winn in 1887, they had no children, but from a dedication in one of his books, it would appear that he adopted a girl, "Mollie Gamble".

Greville helped keep his father's memory alive by arranging the publication of new editions of his works, and by writing the painstakingly-researched biography George MacDonald and His Wife (1924).

Greville wrote books on widely varied subjects, including a biography of his father and mother George MacDonald and His Wife, complex works such as The Sanity of William Blake and The Religious Sense in its Scientific Aspect, and fairy tales such as Count Billy and The Magic Crook, or The Stolen Baby.

In 1900 Greville's parents moved to St George's Wood, Grayswood Road, Haslemere, into a house that he had had built for them, designed by his architect brother, Robert Falconer MacDonald, where his frail father spent his final few years. Those Greville described as his "best friends" – Joseph King (MP), Maude Egerton King, Godfrey Blount, and Ethel Blount – lived in Haslemere, too, and he had visited and stayed with them often. Greville and Joseph King were cousins. In 1913 Greville's wife "lost a leg" and that seems to be part of the reason behind his move to the country. Greville described his involvement in the Peasant Arts movement thus: "Happy that I might possibly help them, I soon assigned my scanty leisure, along with some too easily earned money, to the support of their Society."

Greville negotiated the purchase of the Museum of Peasant Arts from Reverend Gerald Davies in 1908, "at a price well below its value, but on the condition that it should never be displayed in any City Museum, where, he thought, its beauties might be swamped, and its materials damaged by smoke. Realizing the national worth of the collection I put it, by Trust Deed, in the hands of the Founders of the Peasant Arts Guild for the public benefit, thus protecting it against any possible mishap to the Guild." Greville describes himself as launching The Vineyard Magazine in 1910. It was edited by his friend Maude Egerton King.

== Works ==
MacDonald's writings varied in subject matter from medicine to ethical issues to fairy tales—not including editorial contributions to his father's works.

- On the Respiratory Functions of the Nose and Their Relation to Certain Pathological Conditions (1889)
- A Treatise on Diseases of the Nose and Its Accessory Cavities (1890)
- Tree in the Midst: A Contribution to the Study of Freedom (1904)
- The Religious Sense in its Scientific Aspect (1904)
- The Ethics of Revolt (1907)
- The Child's Inheritance: Its Scientific and Imaginative Meaning (1910)
- "Character and Machinery" (c. 1914)
- The Sanity of William Blake (1920)
- George MacDonald and his Wife (1924)
- Children and the Stress of Life (1929), by Macdonald and Helen Gibb
- Reminiscences of a Specialist (1932)

Fiction:

- The Magic Crook, or The Stolen Baby (1911)
- Trystie's Quest, or Kit, King of the Pigwidgeons (1912)
- Jack and Jill: A Fairy Story (1913)
- How Jonas Found His Enemy: A Romance of the South Downs (1916)
- The North Door: A Romance (1920)
- Billy Barnicoat: A Fairy Romance for Young and Old (1922)
- Count Billy (1928) – sequel to Billy Barnicoat
- The Wonderful Goatskin: Being a Tale of Saint George in the Fourth Century A.D. (1944)

== Other sources ==
- Peasant Arts Haslemere
