= William Brighty Rands =

British writer

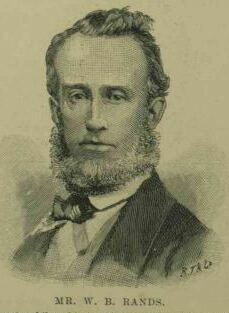
- Born: 24 December 1823; Chelsea, Middlesex, England
- Died: 23 April 1882 (aged 58); East Dulwich, London, England
- Occupation: Writer
- Writing career
- Pen name: Matthew Browne, Henry Holbeach, Tame Talker.
- Period: 19th century
- Genre: Children's Literature
- Website: www.wbrands.com

William Brighty Rands (24 December 1823, Chelsea, Middlesex – 23 April 1882, East Dulwich, London) was a British writer and one of the major authors of nursery rhymes of the Victorian era. His pen names include Matthew Browne, Henry Holbeach, and T. Talker.

== Biography ==
William Brighty Rands was the son of George Rands, who ran a small shop. He received little formal education, but he educated himself primarily through reading secondhand books.

Rands married Mary Ditton in 1846, and the couple had three children. They separated, and Rands began living with Hannah Rolls. Rands and Rolls had four children, and married in 1881 after the death of Ditton.

In 1857, he started working as a reporter in the House of Commons for Messrs. Gurney & Co., and he became their reporter for the House of Commons that same year. He also contributed to the Illustrated Times, the Contemporary Review, Tait's Edinburgh Magazine, and the Pall Mall Gazette, among other newspapers. He wrote his literary works when Parliament was not sitting. In 1875, he resigned due to poor health. Three years later, he founded a newspaper for the City of London. Rands also preached at a Brixton Chapel, where he composed several hymns, some of which became popular.

== Selected works ==
=== Children's works ===
- Lilliput Levee (1864, 1867)
- Lilliput Lectures (1871)
- Lilliput Legends (1872)

=== Literary criticism ===
- (As Matthew Browne) Chaucer's England (1869)
