= Hurst and Blackett =

London publishing company

Hurst and Blackett was a publisher founded in 1852 by Henry Blackett (26 May 1825 – 7 March 1871), the grandson of a London shipbuilder, and Daniel William Stow Hurst (17 February 1802 – 6 July 1870). Shortly after the formation of their partnership Hurst and Blackett took over the business of the long established publisher Henry Colburn, for whom Daniel Hurst had worked for some years, and their earliest publications displayed "Successors to Henry Colburn" on the title pages. This was subsequently replaced by the epithet "Publishers since 1812", probably in reference to the date when Henry Colburn had commenced publishing.

Four of Henry Blackett's sons became publishers. Hurst and Blackett were located on Great Marlborough Street, where Henry Colburn had maintained his premises, and later at Paternoster House, Paternoster Row, London and had offices in New York and Melbourne. They were taken over by Hutchinson, which later became part of Random House.

== Paternoster Library ==
The Paternoster Library was based at Paternoster House, No 34 Paternoster Row in the 1930s. It comprised cheap editions of “interesting, informative and entertaining books” of “real merit” for the discriminating general reader in a cloth binding at 3/6d. They included the autobiographies My Struggle by Adolf Hitler and My Autobiography by Benito Mussolini; Numbers II (1935) and IV (1936). My Struggle was previously published by Hurst and Blackett in October 1933 for 18/- and went through ten impressions to January 1934 before being published in a cheap edition in October 1935 and then two more impressions in December 1935 and March 1936. The title page of the March 1936 edition was noted “14th thousand”.

== Book series ==
- Arcadian Novels
- Famous 2/6 Red Jacket Novels
- Hurst & Blackett's Colonial Library
- Hurst & Blackett's Famous Copyright Library
- Hurst and Blackett's Copyright Novels
- Hurst and Blackett's 6d. Copyright Novels
- Hurst and Blackett's 1/- net Novels
- Hurst & Blackett's 7d. Novels
- Hurst & Blackett's Famous Copyright Novels
- Hurst & Blackett's Famous 6d. Novels
- Hurst and Blackett's Standard Library
- Kiddi-logues Series
- Paternoster Library
- Toucan Novels
- The Valentine Romance Club series
