= List of 19th-century British periodicals =

This is a list of British periodicals established in the 19th century, excluding daily newspapers.

The periodical press flourished in the 19th century: the Waterloo Directory of English Newspapers and Periodicals plans to eventually list more 100,000 titles; the current Series 3 lists 73,000 titles. 19th-century periodicals have been the focus of extensive indexing efforts, such as that of the Wellesley Index to Victorian Periodicals, 1824–1900, Poole's Index to Periodical Literature (now published electronically as part of 19th Century Masterfile), Science in the 19th-Century Periodical and Retrospective Index to Music Periodicals, 1800–1950. There are also a number of efforts to republish 19th-century periodicals online, including ProQuest's British Periodicals Collection I and Collection II, Gale's 19th Century UK Periodicals Online and Nineteenth-Century Serials Edition (ncse).

== List by year of publication ==
=== 1800s ===
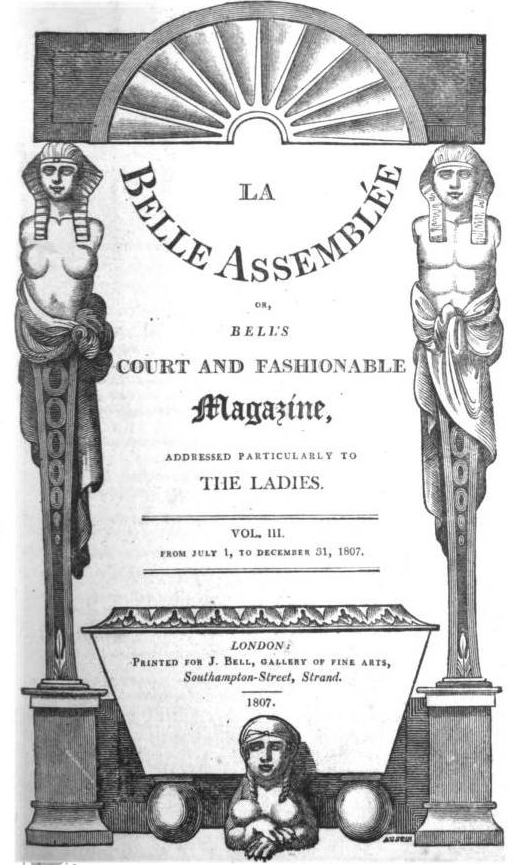
La Belle Assemblée, title page, Volume III, July to December 1807.

- Weekly Dispatch (1801–1928, continued as Sunday Dispatch). Weekly.
- Christian Observer (1802–1874).^{[f]}
- The Guardian of Education (1802–1806)
- The Edinburgh Review (1802–1900). Quarterly.^{[g]}^{[f]}
- The Monthly Register and encyclopedian magazine (1802–1803).^{[e]}
- Political Register (1802–1835). Weekly. Edited by William Cobbett
- Annual Review and History of Literature (1803–1809). Annual. Founded by Arthur Aikin; edited by Aikin (volumes 1–6) and Thomas Rees (volume 7).^{[e]}
- The Anti-Gallican: or Standard of British loyalty, religion and liberty (1804).^{[e]}
- The Eclectic Review (1805–1868). Monthly,
- Youth's Magazine (1805–1867).^{[f]}
- La Belle Assemblée (1806–1832, continued as Court Magazine 1832–1848). Established by John Bell.^{[f]}^{[a]}^{[e]}
- Le Beau Monde (1806–1810). Published by John Browne Bell.
- General Review of British and Foreign Literature (1806). Published by William Nicholson.
- The Monthly Repository (1806–1838). Monthly.^{[c]}
- The Athenaeum: a magazine of literary and miscellaneous information (1807–1809). Edited by John Aikin.^{[e]}
- The Cabinet (1807–1809).
- The Director: a weekly literary journal (1807).^{[e]}
- The Irish magazine, and monthly asylum for neglected biography (1807–1815).^{[e]}
- The Edinburgh Annual Register (1808–1826). Founded by Walter Scott.^{[e]}
- The Examiner (1808–1886). Weekly.
- The Tradesman; or, Commercial magazine (1808–1812).^{[e]}
- Journal of the Royal Society of Medicine (1809–).
- The New Musical Magazine, Review, and Register (1809–1810). Monthly.^{[b]}
- Quarterly Review (1809–1967). Quarterly.^{[e]}.^{[g]}
- Ladies' Fashionable Repository (1809–1829?; continues 1829–1834 as Raw's Ladies Fashionable Repository; 1837–1905 Pawsey's Ladies Fashionable Repository). Annually.^{[a]}
- Repository of arts, literature, commerce, manufactures, fashions, and politics (1809–1829). Established by Rudolph Ackermann.
- Journal of Natural Philosophy, Chemistry and the Arts (1797–1813). Founded by William Nicholson.

=== 1810s ===
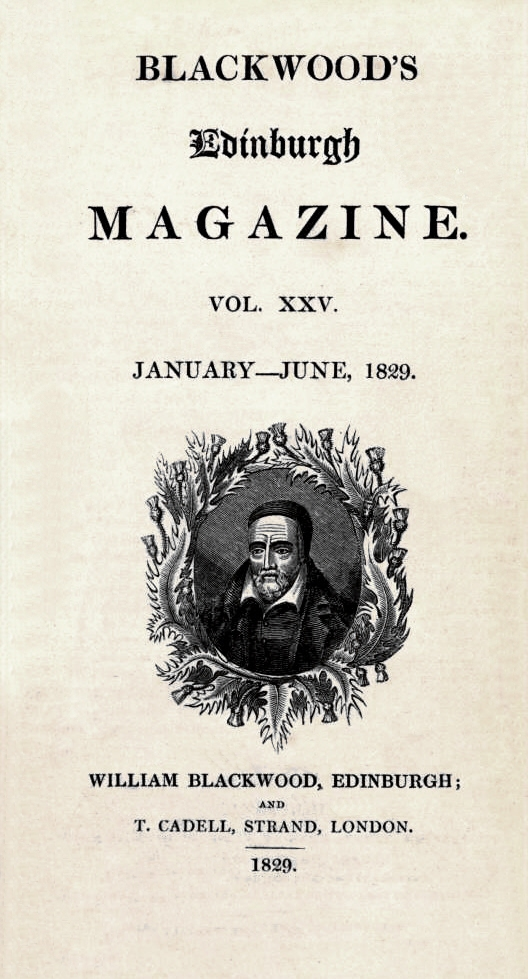
Blackwood's Edinburgh Magazine, Vol. XXV, January–June 1829. William Blackwood, Edinburgh and T. Cadell, Strand, London

- Hibernia Magazine, and Dublin monthly panorama (1810–1811).^{[e]}
- Monthly Panorama (1810).^{[e]}
- The Reflector: quarterly magazine, on subjects of philosophy, politics, and the liberal arts (1810–1811).^{[e]}
- British Review (1811–1825). Quarterly. Founded by John Weylund; edited by Weylund (for 1 or 2 numbers), then by William Roberts (until 1822). Published by John Hatchard.
- Cheap Magazine (1813–1815). Monthly, 4d.
- Monthly Museum; or, Dublin literary repertory of arts, science, literature and miscellaneous information (1813–1814).^{[e]}
- Champion (1814–1822). Edited by John Scott.
- Lady's Monthly Museum; Or, Polite Repository of Amusement and Instruction (1814–1830).^{[a]}
- The New Monthly Magazine (1814–1884). Quarterly.^{[g]}
- Augustan Review (1815–1816). Monthly.
- British Lady's Magazine (1815–1818). Monthly. Published by John Souter.
- Devizes and Wiltshire Gazette (1816–; became the Gazette and Herald in 1956). Weekly.
- The Black Dwarf (1817–1824)^{[f]}
- Blackwood's Edinburgh Magazine (1817–1980). Monthly.^{[g]}^{[f]}
- The Ǣgis; or, Independent weekly expositor (July–September 1818). Weekly,
- The Kaleidoscope; or, Literary and Scientific Mirror. Weekly. Published at Liverpool by Egerton Smith. (1818–1831).^{[e]}
- The Literary Gazette and Journal of Belles Lettres, Arts, Sciences, Etc. (1818–1836). Weekly.
- The Quarterly Musical Magazine and Review (1818–1828).^{[b]}
- Christian Remembrancer (1819–1868). Monthly 1819–1844, quarterly 1844–1868.
- Edinburgh Monthly Review (1819–1821).^{[e]}
- The English Musical Gazette; or, Monthly Intelligencer (1819). Monthly.^{[b]}
- Imperial Magazine (1819–1834). Edited by Samuel Drew.^{[e]}
- Indicator (1819–1821). Weekly. Published by Joseph Appleyard. Edited by Leigh Hunt.

=== 1820s ===
- John Bull (1820–). Weekly.^{[a]}
- Y Cymmrodor (1821–1951).^{[d]}
- Album (1822–1825). Quarterly. Edited by Francis St. Leger.
- Bell's Life in London and Sporting Chronicle (1822–1886)^{[a]}
- The Fancy (1822–1826)^{[a]}
- Glasgow Medical Journal (1822–1956)
- The London Magazine (1822–1829)
- Mirror of Literature (1822–1847)^{[f]}
- Sportsman's Annual (1822?–1870). Annually.^{[a]}
- The Harmonicon (1823–1833). Monthly.^{[b]}
- The Lancet (1823–)
- The Portfolio (1823–1825)
- Mirror of Literature, Amusement and Instruction (1823–1841)
- The Westminster Review (1824–1914). Quarterly and then monthly.^{[g]}
- The Children's Friend (1824–). Monthly.^{[a]}
- Child's Companion (1824–). Monthly.^{[a]}
- The Literary Magnet (1824–1828). Weekly during 1824, then monthly.
- Staffordshire Mercury (1824–1848). Weekly.
- The World of Fashion and Continental Feuilletons (1824–1851; continued 1852–79 as The Ladies Monthly Magazine and World of Fashion; 1880–1891 as Monde Élegant; or the World of Fashion). Monthly.^{[a]}
- The Age (1825–1843; continues 1843–1845 as The Age and Argus, 1845–46 as The English Gentleman). Weekly.^{[a]}
- The Anti-Slavery Reporter (1825–?)
- Birmingham Journal (1825–1869). Weekly.
- The Foreign Quarterly Review (1827–1846). Quarterly.^{[g]}
- The Keepsake (1827–1857). Annually.
- Monthly Notices of the Royal Astronomical Society (1827–)
- Athenaeum (1828–1921)
- Church of England Newspaper (1828–)
- The Spectator (1828–)
- The London Review (1829)^{[g]}
- Pierce Egan's Book of Sports, and Mirror of Life (1829–1836).^{[a]}

=== 1830s ===
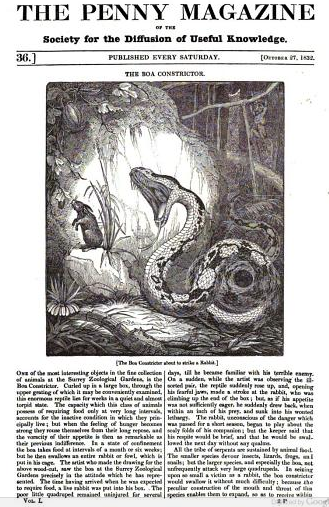
The Penny Magazine, Issue for 27 October 1832

- Fraser's Magazine for Town and Country (1830–1882). Monthly.^{[g]}
- Comic Annual (1830–1839, 1842)^{[f]}
- Figaro in London (1831–1839). Weekly.^{[a]}
- Journal of the Royal Geographical Society of London (1831–1880)
- The Metropolitan Magazine (1831–1850)
- The Poor Man's Guardian (1831–1835). Weekly. 1d.
- Satirist; or, the Censor of the Times (1831–1849). Weekly.^{[a]}
- Chambers's Edinburgh Journal (1832–1956; renamed Chambers's Journal of Popular Literature, Science, and Arts in 1854, and Chambers's Journal in 1897).
- Dublin Journal of Medical & Chemical Science (1832–1925; renamed Dublin Journal of Medical Science, and Dublin Quarterly Journal of Medical Science from 1846 to 1871).
- Hereford Times (1832–). Weekly. 7d.
- The Journal (1832–). Weekly
- Ladies' Cabinet of Fashion, Music and Romance (1832–1870). Monthly.^{[a]}
- The Penny Magazine (1832–1845). Weekly.
- The Saturday Magazine (1832–1844). Weekly.
- Tait's Edinburgh Magazine (1832–1855)^{[g]}
- Mark Lane Express (1832–1924). Weekly.
- The Cheltenham Looker-On (1833–1920)
- The Dublin University Magazine (1833–1877)^{[g]}
- The British and Foreign Review; or, European Quarterly Journal (1835–1844). Quarterly.^{[g]}
- The Gospel Standard (1835–). Monthly
- The London Review (1835–1836)^{[g]}
- The Mining Journal (1835–)
- The London and Westminster Review (1836–1840)^{[g]}
- The Musical World (1836–1891). Weekly.^{[b]}
- The Dublin Review (1836–1900). Quarterly, then monthly.^{[g]}
- Bentley's Miscellany (1837–1868). Monthly.^{[g]}
- Cleave's Penny Gazette (1837–1844). Weekly.^{[a]}
- Justice of the Peace (1837–). Weekly.
- Northern Liberator (1837–1840). Weekly.
- Northern Star (1837–1852). Weekly.^{[c]}
- Penny Satirist (1837–1846; continues 1846 as Penny Satirist and London Pioneer; 1846–1848 as London Pioneer; 1848 as Literary Pioneer). Weekly.^{[a]}
- Publishers' Circular (1837–1959).^{[c]}
- The Era (1838–1939). Weekly
- Journal of the Statistical Society of London (1838–1886, continued as Journal of the Royal Statistical Society)
- The Monthly Chronicle: A National Journal of Politics, Literature, Science, and Art (1838–1841). Monthly.^{[g]}
- The Art Union Monthly Journal, soon renamed The Art Journal (1839–1912). Monthly

=== 1840s ===
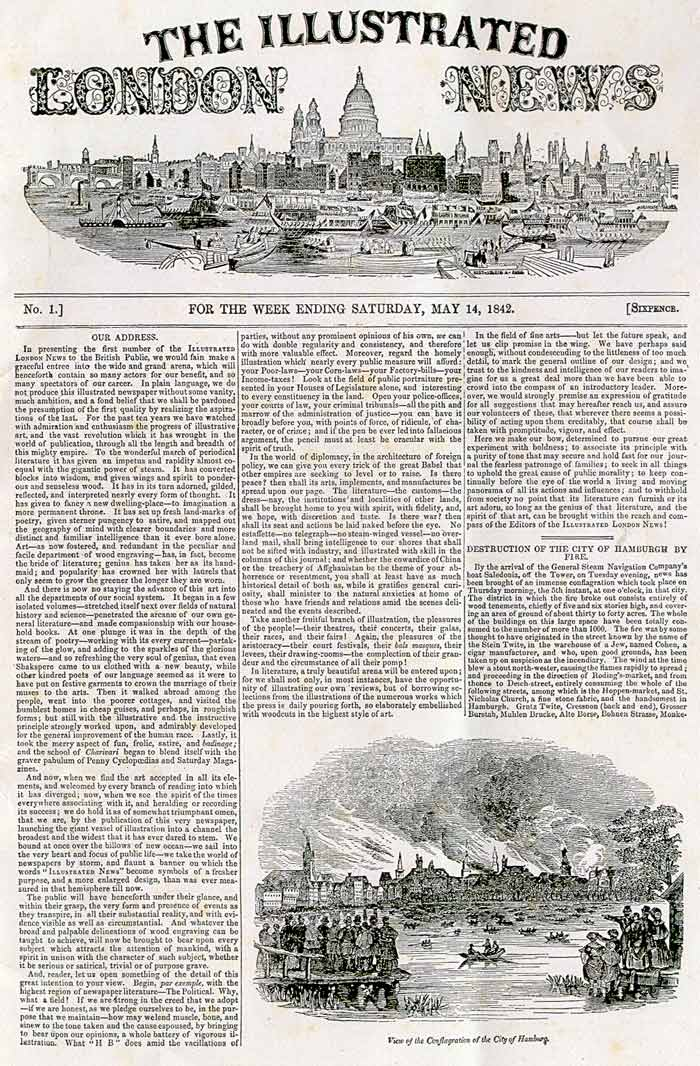
Illustrated London News, first issue, front page

- Millennial Star (1840–1970). Monthly
- The Musical Journal (1840). Weekly.^{[b]}
- Peter Parley's Annual (1840–1892). Annually.^{[a]}
- Provincial Medical and Surgical Journal, later became British Medical Journal (1840–)
- Annals and Magazine of Natural History (1841–), later became Journal of Natural History
- The Gardeners' Chronicle (1841–)
- The Jewish Chronicle (1841–). Weekly
- Punch (1841–1992). Weekly.^{[a]}^{[f]}
- Ainsworth's Magazine: A Miscellany of Romance, General Literature, & Art (1842–1854)^{[g]}
- The Friend (1842–). Weekly.
- Illustrated London News (1842–). Weekly. 6d.
- Lloyd's Weekly Newspaper (1842–). Weekly.
- The Musical Examiner (1842–1844). Weekly.^{[b]}
- The Illustrated Weekly Times (1843–1843). Weekly.
- The Builder (1843–). Weekly.
- The Economist (1843–). Weekly.
- Family Friend (1842–). Weekly
- The Family Herald: A Domestic Magazine of Useful Information & Amusement (1843–1940). Weekly.
- News of the World (1843–2011). Weekly. 3d.
- Pictorial Times (1843–1848). Weekly.
- The Zoologist (1843–). Monthly.
- Archaeological Journal (1844–). Quarterly (annually after 1927)
- The Musical Times (1844–). Monthly.^{[b]}
- The North British Review (1844–1871). Quarterly.^{[g]}
- Preston Guardian (1844–; renamed Farmers Guardian in 1958)
- The Prospective Review: A Quarterly Journal of Theology and Literature (1845–1855). Quarterly.^{[g]}
- The British Quarterly Review (1845–1886). Quarterly.^{[g]}
- Hood's Magazine and Comic Miscellany (1845–1849). Monthly.
- The London Journal (1845–1906). Weekly.
- Norfolk News (1845–). Weekly.
- Sharpe's London Journal (1845–1870). Weekly 1845–1847, monthly 1848–1870.
- British Mothers' Magazine (1845–64). Monthly.^{[a]}
- Juvenile Companion, and Sunday-School Hive (1845–1891). Monthly.^{[a]}
- Archaeologia Cambrensis (1846–1999). Annually.^{[d]}
- Le Follet (1846–). Monthly.^{[a]}
- The Guardian [Anglican newspaper] (1846–1951). Weekly.
- Prophwyd y Jubili (1846–1848). Monthly.
- Lady's Newspaper and Pictorial Times (1847–1863). Weekly.^{[a]}
- The Rambler (1848–1862). Weekly (January–August 1848), then monthly (until February 1589), then bimonthly (until 1862).^{[g]}
- Red Republican (1848–1850). Weekly.
- Eliza Cook's Journal (1849–1853). Weekly.
- Notes and Queries (1849–). Weekly.
- Spirit of Freedom, and Working Man's Vindicator (1849–1850)

=== 1850s ===
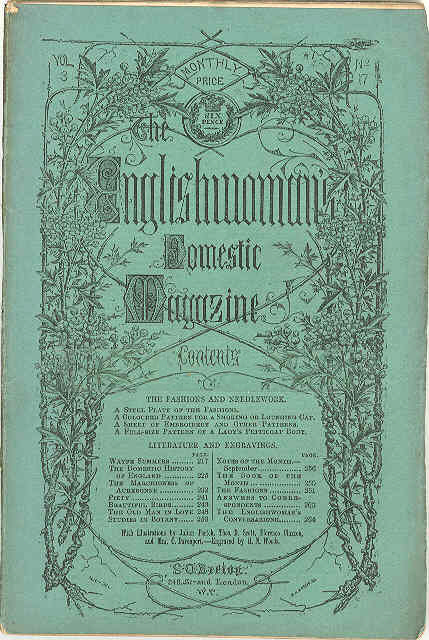
The Englishwoman's Domestic Magazine, title page, September 1861

- Photographic Journal. The Journal of the Photographic Society (periodical)|Journal of the Photographic Society (1853–). Monthly.
- British Journal of Photography (periodical)|British Journal of Photography (1854–). Weekly.
- Photographic News (periodical)|Photographic News (1858–). Weekly.
- The Germ (1850–1850). Monthly.
- Harper's New Monthly Magazine (1850–). Monthly.^{[f]}
- Household Words (1850–1859). Weekly.
- The Leader (1850–1860). Weekly.^{[c]}
- Reynold's News (1850–). Weekly.
- Monthly Packet of Evening Readings for Younger Members of the English Church (1851–1899). Monthly.^{[a]}
- Racing Times (1851–1868). Weekly.^{[a]}
- The Englishwoman's Domestic Magazine (1852–1874; 1877; 1880–1890). Monthly.^{[a]}^{[f]}
- Craven Herald (1853–). Monthly; later weekly.
- The Field (1853–)
- The London Quarterly Review (1853–1900). Quarterly.^{[g]}
- Quarterly Journal of Microscopical Science (1853–1965; from 1966 the Journal of Cell Science)
- Alnwick Mercury (1854–; renamed Alnwick and County Gazette in 1883, Northumberland and Alnwick Gazette in 1943, and Northumberland Gazette in 1947)
- Morpeth Herald (1854–). Monthly; weekly from 1858.
- The National Review (1855–1864). Quarterly.^{[g]}
- The Orcadian (1854–). Monthly, then weekly.
- Swindon Advertiser and Monthly Record (1854–). Monthly, 1d.; from 1855 weekly; from 1898 daily.
- Illustrated Times (1855–1872). Weekly.
- Boys' Own Magazine (1855–1874)^{[a]}
- Derbyshire Times (1855–). Weekly.
- The Harrow Monthly Gazette and General Advertiser (1855–). 2d.
- Local Government Chronicle (1855–)
- Military Chronicle and Naval Spectator (1855–; later Rochester, Chatham and Gillingham News). Weekly.
- The Saturday Review of Politics, Literature, Science, and Art (1855–1938). Weekly.
- The Weekly News (1855–). Weekly.
- The Oxford and Cambridge Magazine (1856)^{[g]}
- The Engineer (1856–)
- The Atlantic Monthly (1857–1915). Monthly.
- Friendly Companion and Illustrated Instructor (1857–). Monthly.^{[a]}
- Journal of the Royal United Service Institution (1857–)
- The Atlantis (1858–1860, 1862–1863, 1870)^{[g]}
- The Bookseller (1858–)
- English Women's Journal (1858–1864). Monthly.^{[c]}
- Estates Gazette (1858–)
- Ladies' Treasury: An Illustrated Magazine of Entertaining Literature (1857–1895). Monthly.^{[a]}
- All the Year Round (1859–1895). Weekly.
- Bentley's Quarterly Review (1859–1860). Quarterly.^{[g]}
- Chemist and Druggist (1859–)
- The Eagle (1859–)
- Macmillan's Magazine (1859–1907). Monthly.^{[g]}
- Sporting Life (1859–1998). Weekly, then daily after 1883.
- Transactions of the South Wales Institute of Engineers (1859–).

=== 1860s ===
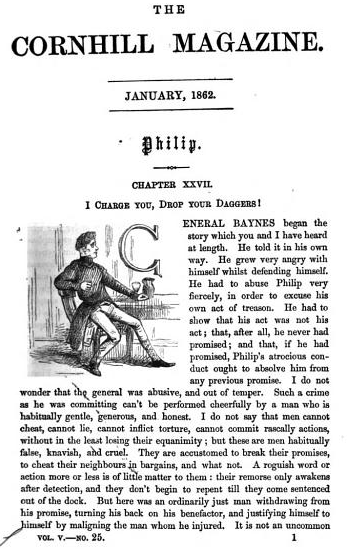
Cornhill Magazine, January 1862

- The Cornhill Magazine (1860–1975). Monthly.^{[g]}^{[f]}
- Investors Chronicle (1860–)
- Temple Bar: A London Magazine for Town and Country Readers (1860–1900)^{[g]}
- Baily's Monthly Magazine of Sports and Pastimes (1860–1926). Monthly.^{[a]}
- The Bee-Hive (1861–1878). Weekly.
- Fun (1861–1901). Weekly.^{[a]}
- Penny Illustrated Paper (1861–1913). Weekly. 1d.
- The Queen (1861–)
- The Home and Foreign Review (1862–1864)^{[g]}
- Every Boy's Magazine (1862–1889; titled Routledge's Magazine for Boys 1865–1868, and Young Gentleman's Magazine 1869–1873). Monthly.^{[a]}
- The Grocer (1862–)
- The Musical Standard (1862–1933). Semimonthly 1862–1863, biweekly 1864–1866 weekly 1866–.^{[b]}
- London Society (1862–1898). Monthly.
- Sporting Gazette (1862–1878; continued 1879 as Sporting Gazette and Agricultural Journal; 1880–1903 as Country Gentleman, Sporting Gazette and Agricultural Journal; 1903–1905 as Country Gentleman; 1905–15 as Country Gentleman and Land and Water; 1916–1920 as Land and Water). Weekly.^{[a]}
- Alpine Journal (1863–) Annually.
- Church Times (1863–) Weekly.
- The Theological Review: A Quarterly Journal of Religious Thought and Life (1864–1879). Quarterly.^{[g]}
- Alexandra Magazine (1864–1865). Monthly.^{[a]}
- Entomologist's Monthly Magazine (1864–). Monthly / quarterly?
- The Geological Magazine (1864–)
- The Illustrated Police News (1864–1939)
- The Month (1864–2001). Monthly.
- The Musical Monthly and Repertoire of Literature, the Drama, and the Arts (1864–1865). Monthly.^{[b]}
- The Owl: a Wednesday journal of politics and society (1864–) Weekly.
- The English Mechanic and World of Science (1865–1926). Weekly.
- Fishing Gazette (1865–1962). Weekly.^{[a]}
- The Fortnightly Review (1865–1900). Fortnightly for a year, then monthly.^{[g]}
- Hardwicke's Science Gossip: A Monthly Medium of Interchange and Gossip for Students and Lovers of Nature (1865–1893). Monthly.
- Merry & Wise; a magazine for young people (1865–1872). Monthly.^{[a]}
- Sporting Times (1865–1931). Weekly.^{[a]}
- The Contemporary Review (1866–) Monthly.^{[g]}
- The Journal of the Royal Horticultural Society (1866–)
- Aunt Judy's Magazine (1866–1885). Monthly.^{[a]}
- Chatterbox (1866–1953). Weekly / monthly.^{[a]}
- Boys of England (1866–1899, continues as Up-To-Date Boys' Journal 1899–1901, Boys of England 1901?–1906). Weekly.^{[a]}
- Englishwoman's Review (1866–1910). Monthly / quarterly.^{[a]}
- Father William's Stories (1866–1867, continues 1868–81 as The Children's Treasury and 1881 as Our Darlings). Monthly / weekly.^{[a]}
- Kind Words for Boys and Girls (1866–1937). Monthly / weekly.^{[a]}
- Judy; or the London serio-comic journal (1867–1907). Weekly.^{[a]}
- Reports and transactions of the Cardiff Naturalists Society (1867–1986). Annually.
- Saint Pauls: A Monthly Magazine (1867–1874). Monthly.^{[g]}
- The Tomahawk (1867–1870). Weekly.^{[a]}^{[c]}
- Football Annual (1868–1908). Annually.
- Collections Historical & Archaeological relating to Montgomeryshire (1868–)^{[d]}
- Good Words for the Young (1868–1877). Monthly / weekly.^{[a]}
- Academy (1869–1916). Weekly.^{[f]}
- The Graphic (1869–1932). Weekly.
- Nature (1869–). Weekly.
- The People's Friend (1869–). Weekly.
- Belgravia: A London Magazine (1866–1876). Monthly. Bound copies contained four months. Continued with slight title variation to 1899.

=== 1870s ===
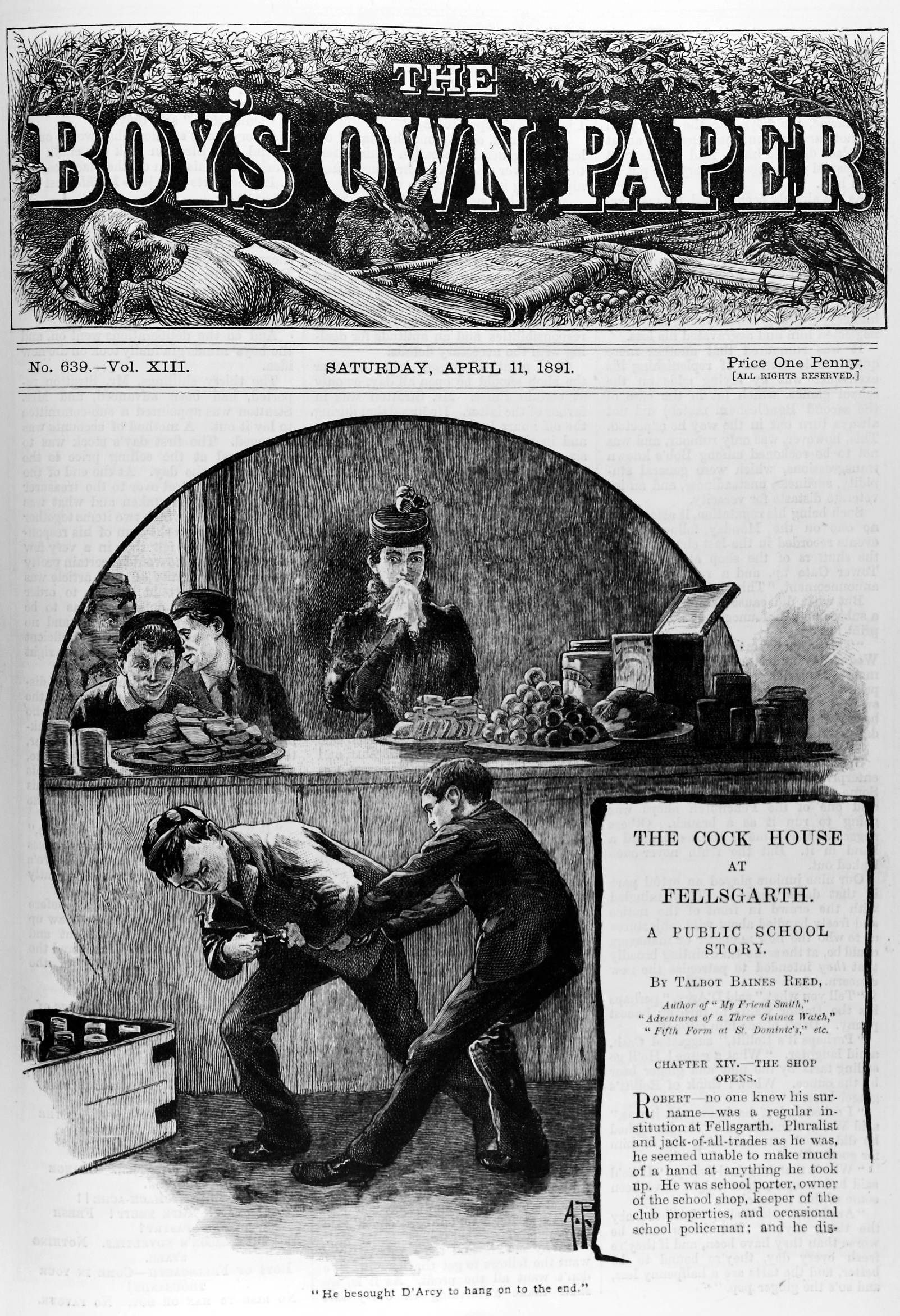
The Boy's Own Paper, front page, 11 April 1891

- Truth (British periodical) (1877–1957)
- Shield; the Anti-Contagious Diseases Acts Association's weekly circular (1870–1886; continues 1897–1916 as The Shield / Josephine Butler Society; 1916–1933 as The Shield; a review of moral and social hygiene).^{[a]}
- The Phoenix (1870–1873). Monthly, with a focus on Asia.
- The London Figaro; (1870–1898). Literary and satirical magazine. Daily for the first 9 months, then weekly.
- The Dark Blue (1871–1873)^{[g]}
- Little Folks; the magazine for boys and girls; a magazine for the young (1871–1933). Weekly, then monthly.^{[a]}
- Our Young Folk's Weekly Budget (1871–1876, continues 1876–1879 as Young Folk's Weekly Budget, 1879–1884 as Young Folks, 1884–1891 as Young Folks, 1891–1896 as Old and Young, 1896–1897 as Folks-at-Home). Weekly.^{[a]}
- St. Nicholas; Scribner's illustrated magazine for girls and boys (1872–). Monthly.^{[a]}
- The New Quarterly Magazine (1873–1880). Quarterly.^{[g]}
- Journal of the Women's Education Union (1873–1881). Monthly.^{[a]}
- Passing Events; at home and abroad (1873). Weekly.^{[a]}
- Funny Folks (1874–1894); Vol. IV available openly and freely from the UF Digital Collections^{[a]}
- The Women's Advocate (1874). Monthly.^{[a]}
- Women and Work (1874–1876). Weekly.^{[a]}
- Little Wide-Awake. A story book for little children (1874–1893)^{[a]} (Lucy Sale-Barker, editor)
- Myra's Journal of Dress and Fashion (1875–) Monthly.^{[a]}
- The Dart (1876–1911). Weekly.^{[a]}
- Mind (1876–)
- Women's Union Journal (1876–1890; continued 1891 as Quarterly Report and Review; 1891–1919 as Women's Trade Union Review). Monthly / quarterly.^{[a]}
- The Nineteenth Century (1877–1900). Monthly.^{[g]}
- The Observatory (1877–)
- The Statist (1878–1967). Sub-titled 'a weekly journal for economics and men of business' until 1894; thereafter 'an independent journal of finance and trade'. Weekly.
- The University Magazine (1878–1880)^{[g]}
- Routledge's Every Girl's Annual (1878–1886?; continues 1887–1888 as Every Girl's Annual). Annually.^{[a]}
- Moonshine (1879–1902). Weekly.^{[a]}
- Boy's Own Paper (1879–1967). Weekly.^{[f]}^{[a]}
- Owl; a journal of wit and wisdom (1879–1911). Weekly.^{[a]}
- Ruthin Illustrated Magazine (1879–1881

=== 1880s ===
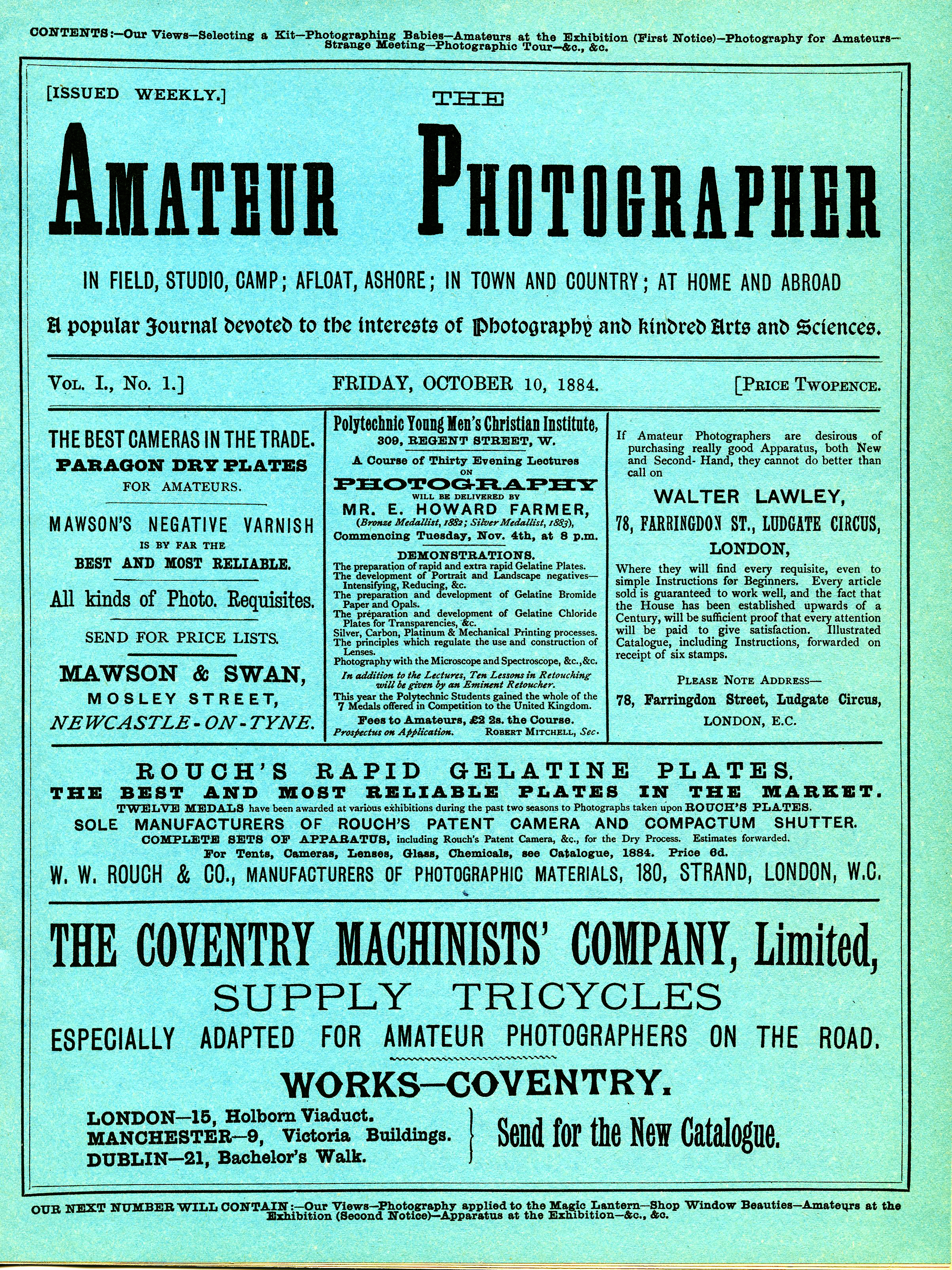
The Amateur Photographer, Vol. 1, No 1, 10 October 1884, front cover.

- The Modern Review: A Quarterly Magazine (1880–1884)^{[g]}
- The Union Jack; a magazine of healthy, stirring tales of adventure by land or sea (1880–1883). Weekly.^{[a]}
- Girl's Own Paper (1880–1956). Weekly, then monthly.^{[a]}
- Young England magazine (1880–1937). Weekly, then monthly, then annually.
- British Chess Magazine (1881–). Monthly.
- Tit-Bits (1881–). Weekly.
- Knowledge (1881–1918). Weekly, then monthly.
- Kate Greenaway's Almanack (1882–)^{[a]}
- Longman's Magazine (1882–1900). Monthly.^{[g]}
- The Scottish Review (1882–1900)^{[g]}
- Surveyor (1882–). Weekly.
- Wildfowler's Shooting Times and Kennel News, later Shooting Times (1882–)
- The National Review (London) (1883–)^{[g]}
- British Women's Temperance Journal (1883–1892; 1892 continues as Wings).^{[a]}
- Ally Sloper's Half Holiday (1884–). Weekly.^{[a]}
- (The) Amateur Photographer (1884–). Weekly, 2d.
- Amateur Gardening (1884–)
- The Century Guild Hobby Horse (1884–1892, continued 1893–1894 as The Hobby Horse). Quarterly.
- Horse & Hound (1884–). Weekly.^{[a]}
- Justice (1884–1925). Weekly.
- Walter's Theatrical and Sporting Directory and Book of Reference (1884–1893). Annually.^{[a]}
- Arbeyter Fraynd (1885–1914)
- Commonweal (1885–1894). Monthly, then weekly.
- The Quarterly Musical Review (1885–1888). Quarterly.^{[b]}
- The Lady (1885–)
- Freedom (1886–)
- Atalanta (1887–1898). Monthly.^{[a]}
- Stories Illustrated (1887–1888); founded by John Francon Williams.
- Murray's Magazine. (1887–1891). Monthly.
- Our Little Dots. Pretty pictures and stories for little girls and boys (1887–) Monthly.^{[a]}
- Lucifer (1887–1897)
- The Dawn (1888–1896). Quarterly.^{[a]}
- Licensed Victuallers' Mirror (1888–1892, continues 1892– as Sporting Mirror). Weekly.^{[a]}
- Pick-Me-Up (1888–1909). Weekly.^{[a]}
- The Women's Penny Paper (1888–1890; continued 1891–1899 as The Women's Herald). Weekly.^{[a]}
- Boys' Brigade Gazette (1889–) Quarterly.
- The Dial (1889–1897), founded by Charles Ricketts and Charles Shannon.
- The New Review (1889–1897)^{[g]} at Google books
- English edition of Puck (1889–1890)
- The Handy Shipping Guide (1887–1988). Weekly; (2009–) Daily.
- Harmsworth Monthly Pictorial (1889–1903) founded by the Harmsworth Brothers.

=== 1890s ===
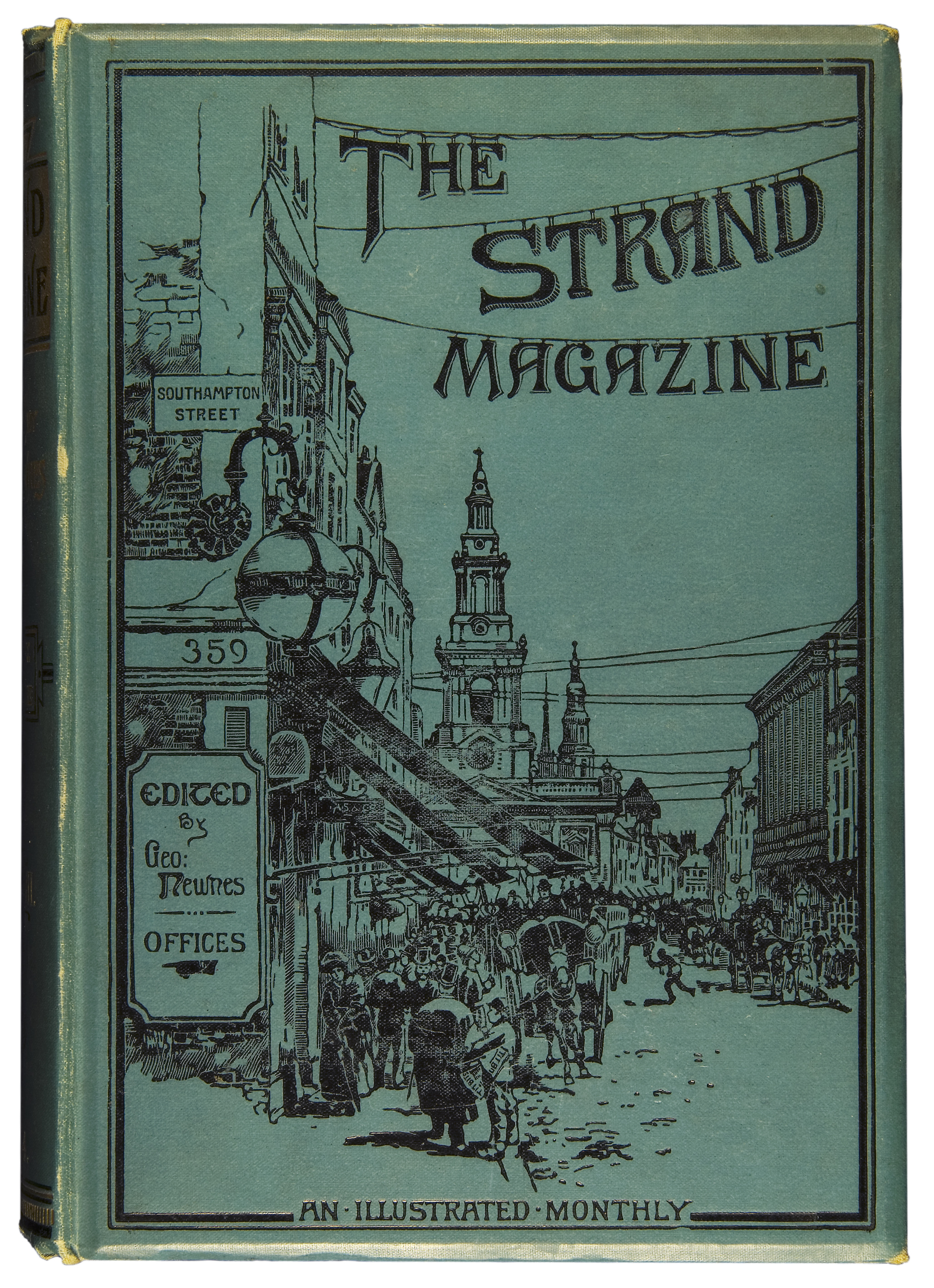
Bound volume of The Strand Magazine for January–June 1894

- Review of Reviews (1890–1953). Monthly.^{[f]}
- Golf (1890–1899, continues 1899– as Golf Illustrated)^{[a]}
- Illustrated Chips (1890–) Weekly.^{[a]}
- Golden Gates (1891–1892, continues 1892–1895 as Winter's Weekly).
- The Bookman (1891–1934). Monthly.
- Cycling (1891–; briefly in the 1890s Cycling and Moting). Weekly.^{[a]}
- The Strand Magazine (1891–1950)
- The Ludgate Monthly (1891–1893; 1893–1895 as The Ludgate Illustrated Magazine; 1895–1901 as The Ludgate).
- Chums (1892–)^{[a]}
- Hearth and Home (1891–1914)^{[a]}
- The Idler (1892–1911). Monthly.
- Isis (1892–) Weekly.
- The Pagan Review (1892). Discontinued after one issue.
- Bright Eyes: an annual for young folk (1893–)^{[a]}
- Halfpenny Marvel (1893–1898, continues 1898– as The Marvel)^{[a]}
- The New Quarterly Review (1893–1896). Quarterly.^{[b]}
- Transactions of the Honourable Society of Cymmrodorion / Trafodion Anrhydedd Gymdeithas y Cymmrodorion (1893–)
- The Woman at Home (1893–1920; continued 1920–1921 as The Home Magazine; 1922 as The Ladies Home Magazine; 1922–1931 as The Home Magazine and the Ladies Field). Monthly / weekly.^{[a]}
- The New Age (1894–1922?)
- Picture Politics (1894–1914). Monthly.^{[a]}
- Tiny Tots; an annual for very little people (1894–1940). Monthly / fortnightly / annually.^{[a]}
- The Yellow Book (1894–1897). Quarterly.
- Union Jack (1894–1933). Weekly. (renamed Detective Weekly in 1933, this continued until 1940 but was cancelled due to paper rationing).
- The Autocar (1895–)
- Racing Illustrated (1895–1896).^{[a]}
- The Savoy (1896).
- The Pageant (1896–1897), edited by Charles Shannon and Gleeson White.
- Big Budget (1897–1909)^{[a]}
- Country Life (1897–)
- The Dome (1897–1900). Quarterly, then monthly.
- The Railway Magazine (1897–). Monthly.
- Dos Fraye Vort (1898)
- The Ladies Field (1898–1922)
- The Princess (1890–1898)
- Model Engineer Magazine (1898–)
- The Storm-Bell (1898–1900). Monthly.^{[a]}
- The Anglo-Saxon Review (1899–1901). Quarterly.
- The Captain (1899–1924)^{[a]}
- Musical Budget (1892–?). Monthly.
- Home and Hearth (1891–1914). Weekly.
- The Album: A Journal of Photographs of Men, Women, and Events of the Day (1895-1896?). Published by Ingram Brothers, 198, Strand, London.
