= Cold turkey =

Abrupt cessation of substance use

Cold turkey refers to the abrupt cessation of substance use in the context of substance dependence, as opposed to gradually easing the process through reduction over time or by using replacement medication. Sudden withdrawal from drugs such as alcohol, benzodiazepines, and barbiturates can be extremely dangerous, leading to potentially fatal seizures. For long-term alcoholics, going cold turkey can cause life-threatening delirium tremens. In the case of opioid withdrawal, going "cold turkey" is extremely unpleasant but less dangerous. Life-threatening issues are unlikely unless one has a pre-existing medical condition.

== Etymology ==
The origin of the phrase "cold turkey" in the sense of unpleasant withdrawal is a matter of some debate and ambiguity.

=== Reaction to being served cheap meat ===
Scholars of 19th-century British periodicals have pointed to the UK satirical magazine Judy as the catalyst of the evolution in the phrase's meaning. The journal's issue of January 3, 1877, featured the fictional diary of one John Hume, Esquire, a Scrooge-like miser who disapproves of Christmas. When Hume is invited to stay at his cousin Clara's as a part of her household's celebrations, he is shocked to be served slices of cold turkey on the evening of his arrival. That cold turkey is a poor substitute for the roasted and dressed dish, played for comic effect. The dissatisfied barrister stays several days nonetheless, and with each passing day, he is more and more shocked to be served cold turkey each day. The story ends with Hume, disgusted at having been treated so badly, removing Clara from his will and testament.

A possible hypothesis is that Hume's behavior towards Clara - excluding and excommunicating her in retaliation for her ongoing ill-treatment of him - became known as "the cold turkey treatment", and that word quickly spread from London to the rest of Britain, and finally the United States.

An early print appearance of "cold turkey" in its exclusionary sense dates to 1910, in Canadian poet Robert W. Service's The Trail of '98: A Northland Romance: "Once I used to gamble an' drink the limit. One morning I got up from the card-table after sitting there thirty-six hours. I'd lost five thousand dollars. I knew they'd handed me out 'cold turkey'..."

=== "Talking turkey" ===
Another possible origin relates to the American phrase talk turkey, meaning "to speak bluntly with little preparation". The phrase "taking cold turkey" has also been reported during the 1920s as slang for pleading guilty.

=== Goosebumps ===
The term is also attributed to piloerection or "goose bumps" that occurs with abrupt withdrawal from opioids, which resembles the skin of a plucked refrigerated turkey.

The similar term "kick the habit" alludes to the muscle spasms that occur in addition to goosebumps in some cases.

== Usage ==
A term appears in its contemporary usage in a December 1920 New York City medical bulletin:

Some addicts voluntarily stop taking opiates and "suffer it out" as they express it without medical assistance, a process which in their slang is called taking "cold turkey"...

Another early printed use, this one in the media to refer to drug withdrawal occurred in the Daily Colonist in British Columbia in 1921:

Perhaps the most pitiful figures who have appeared before Dr Carleton Simon ... are those who voluntarily surrender themselves. When they go before him, that are given what is called the 'cold turkey' treatment.

The Plastic Ono Band released the song "Cold Turkey" in 1969, which was lyrically inspired from brief heroin addictions endured by John Lennon and Yoko Ono.

== See also ==
- Smoking cessation
- Drug withdrawal
- Delirium tremens
