= The Boys' Brigade in the United Kingdom and Republic of Ireland =

Christian youth organization

The Boys' Brigade
- Founded: 4 October 1883
- Founder: Sir William Alexander Smith
- Founded at: Glasgow, United Kingdom
- Purpose: The Object of The Boys' Brigade is: "The advancement of Christ’s kingdom among Boys and the promotion of habits of Obedience, Reverence, Discipline, Self-respect and all that tends towards a true Christian manliness."
- Headquarters: Felden Lodge, Hemel Hempstead, Herts
- Region served: United Kingdom & Ireland
- Members: 20,000 Children and Young Leaders in over 750 Companies
- President: Rev Dez Johnston
- Brigade Secretary: Jonathan Eales
- Volunteers: 7,000 volunteer Leaders
- Website: boys-brigade.org.uk

The Boys' Brigade is the largest Christian uniformed youth organisation in the United Kingdom and Ireland. The Boys' Brigade was founded in Glasgow, Scotland, on 4 October 1883 by Sir William Alexander Smith, and celebrated its 125th anniversary in 2008. Felden Lodge in Hemel Hempstead, Hertfordshire, no longer serves as the main headquarters as it was sold in 2023. Other regions have their own regional headquarters. Today the BB has in the region of 20,000 boys involved in over 750 companies ranging geographically from Shetland to Guernsey.

The Boys' Brigade operates in Northern Ireland and County Donegal under The Northern Ireland Boys' Brigade (BBNI) and is independent of The Boys' Brigade UK & RoI.

== History ==
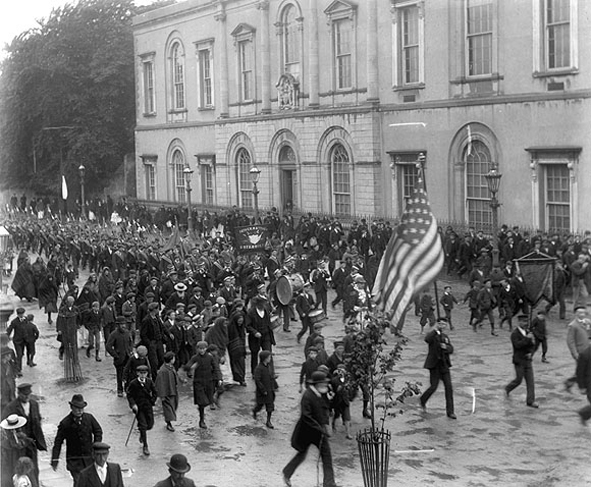
Boys' Brigade marching towards New Ross, County Wexford, 1898

The first Company of The Boys' Brigade was set up by Sir William Alexander Smith, on 4 October 1883 at Free Church Mission Hall, North Woodside Road, Glasgow, Scotland, to develop "Christian manliness" by the use of a semi-military discipline and order, gymnastics, summer camps, and religious services and classes.

In the years following the establishment of the 1st Glasgow company, others were rapidly formed throughout Scotland and the rest of the United Kingdom leading to a movement comprising thousands of boys: in the early 20th century, there were about 2,200 companies connected with different churches throughout the United Kingdom, the rest of the British Empire, and the United States, with 10,000 officers and 160,000 boys.

== The Object ==
The object of The Boys' Brigade since its formation has been "the advancement of Christ's kingdom among Boys and the promotion of habits of Obedience, Reverence, Discipline, Self-respect and all that tends towards a true Christian manliness", although the word Obedience was added ten years after the founding of the organisation. These aims led The Boys' Brigade to become one of the founders of The National Council for Voluntary Youth Services (NCVYS), which is an England-wide organisation working to support and promote the activities of charities and groups with a focus on the welfare of young people. The Boys' Brigade has remained a member of NCVYS since its creation in 1936. When writing the object, Sir William Alexander Smith wrote down all of the important words in capital letters as to highlight them and as true of his century, when Glasgow was the heart of Queen Victoria's expanding empire, it was said that everything was either flown, carted, shipped or carried from there that was in the Industrial Revolution.

== Motto ==
The motto of The Boys' Brigade takes the organisation back to its roots and the reason for its work, the Bible, teaching Christ’s Kingdom to Boys. Upon designing both the motto and emblem of the Boys' Brigade, Sir William Smith took inspiration from the Bible, particularly Hebrews 6:19, which says 'Which hope we have as an anchor of the soul, both sure and stedfast'. At that time, the Authorised Version was almost exclusively used amongst Christians, and thus the spelling of "Stedfast" (rather than "Steadfast") was used. Some people and companies still prefer to use the former spelling.

== The Emblem ==
The original emblem was also designed by Sir William Alexander Smith. As with the motto, the inspiration came from Hebrews 6:19. The emblem contained an anchor and rope with the words "Sure" on the top bar and "Stedfast" on the bottom. The anchor was used to represent the faith the boys were called to have in Jesus Christ, and the rope to represent faith and hope in him.

On 1 October 1926, The Boys' Brigade amalgamated with the Boys’ Life Brigade. As part of this newly united organisation, the Boys' Brigade anchor became combined neatly with the Geneva Cross of the Boys' Life Brigade to form their current emblem. The rope that was in the original design is now largely hidden behind the cross.

== The Uniform ==
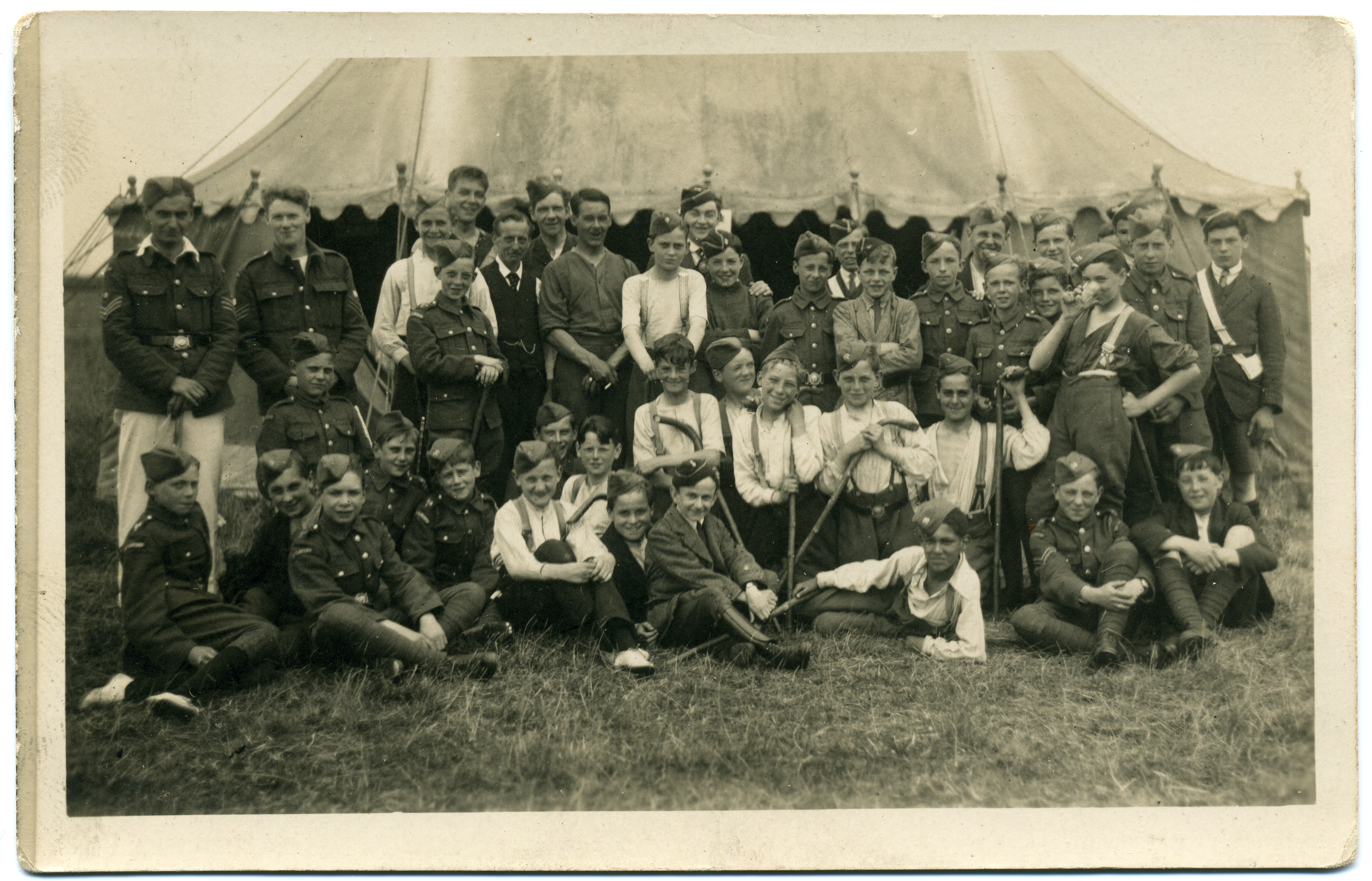
South London Boys' Brigade at summer camp, early 20th century

Since its inception, the uniform of The Boys' Brigade has undergone several remodellings, from a formal military-styled uniform to a modern much more casual variant.

Early uniforms were often based upon school uniforms, jacket, tie and trousers with dress shoes with the simple addition of a brown belt with brass buckle and a white haversack and a pillbox hat (a common cap in the British Army of the 19th century). The pocket functionality of the haversack later disappeared and dummy rifles used for drill and parade purposes were eliminated on the Brigades' amalgamation with the Boys' Life Brigade which objected to the symbolism of weapons.

Lord Baden-Powell's interest in the organisation and the introduction of scouting led to some units of Boys' Brigade scouts being formed in the early years with a similar uniform to that seen in early scouting but in blue.

In the 1960s the uniform was updated with the replacement of the pill box with a forage cap and, with many schools no longer using a blazer in their uniform, from the 1970s the jacket was gradually dispensed of in favour of dark blue or white shirt variants with no jacket. Many companies adopted a blue shirt with epaulets for officers ranks.

A full company section uniform for boys from the 1980s to mid-1990s could be daunting. Blue shirt, forage cap, brown leather belt with brass buckle, white lanyard under the left shoulder attached to the left breast pocket, white haversack (red sash for Colour Sergeants or brown leather haversack and stick for Staff Sergeant) over the right shoulder, main armband with rank on the upper right arm (right cuff for Staff Sergeant) and achievement badges, on the left arm band.

The rank insignia for NCOs imitated that of the British Army with one to three downward pointing chevrons being used from Lance-Corporal to Sergeant. The four up-pointing chevrons on the lower right cuff for Staff Sergeants continued to imitate the insignia used by senior sergeants in the British Army up until the first world war. Trained officers (Lieutenants and Captains) wore a metal Boys' Brigade anchor on each of their upper lapels (epaulettes in shirt dress), a black Glengarry cap with silver badge on a black rosette and brown leather gloves. A Captain was distinguished by his cane carried under the right arm. Warrant Officers (adult leaders not having gone through the formal officer training) wore a metal badge in place of the anchor which featured the letters BB in a surrounding laurel.

The modern uniform is more relaxed with a choice of polo-shirt and pullover or shirt and tie with variations for ranks and sections. Headgear is optional.

Up until the last uniform change around the turn of this century, it was common for presentation of the uniform to be marked at meetings and at camp. For example, Brasso on the white haversack would see points deducted, as would boot polish on the belt buckle. These points competitions were often fiercely fought between squads.

More Boys' Brigade - History

== National structure ==
Each local group of The Boys' Brigade is known as a Company and is part of a Church or other Christian organisation. Companies are normally grouped into Battalions, which are in turn grouped into Districts.

Each District is then grouped into one of Regions, which are:

- Scotland
- England
- Wales
- Republic of Ireland

A notable exception however is that Districts do not exist in Scotland, with Battalions being grouped directly to form the Region.

The Northern Ireland Boys' Brigade (BBNI), which operates in Northern Ireland and County Donegal, is independent of The Boys' Brigade UK & RoI.

== Sections within a Company ==
Within a Company (local group), each boy or young man will normally fall into one of four Sections (age groups):

- Anchor Boys - 5 to 8 years of age
- Junior Section - 8 to 11 years of age
- Company Section - 11 to 15 years of age
- Seniors - 15 to 18 years of age

Some Companies can admit 4 year-olds to the Anchor Boys, where they have the appropriate training and authorisation.

Companies which have opted to have a Girls' Association can admit girls and young ladies to the same Sections based upon the same age groups.

The Boys' Brigade also offers the Amicus scheme, whereby an Amicus group can be set up at a church either independently or alongside a Company of The Boys' Brigade or The Girls' Brigade. Such groups provide an alternative programme to young people aged from the equivalent of an English school year 11 up to 22 years of age.

== Leadership ==
Officers are designated as Warrant Officers attaining the rank of lieutenant only when having completed additional formal training in youth leadership. To avoid unnecessary officer hierarchy, all qualified officers are Lieutenants. The post of captain of a company is a brevet rank with those in the position reverting to lieutenant when they cease to be in the position; similarly other positions such as the company adjutant (second to the captain) are considered appointments rather than substantive ranks.

Older boys can be promoted to be non-commissioned officers. There are four levels of non-commissioned officer, each being awarded when a boy reaches a high enough standard of leadership. The four levels are lance-corporal (minimum age 14), corporal (minimum age 15), sergeant (minimum age 16), and staff sergeant (minimum age 17). Non-commissioned officers often play an important role in The Boys' Brigade, helping the officers and other adults with organising activities and awards classes, particular in the Anchor and Junior sections. Based on the rank insignia of the British Army at the time the brigade was formed, non-commissioned officer to the rank of sergeant wear chevrons on their upper right arm, and staff sergeants wear four chevrons on the lower sleeve, with the point facing upwards.

== See also ==
- Boys' Brigade
- Girls' Brigade
