= Surveyor (magazine) =

Surveyor is a British professional weekly magazine for those in the public and private sectors providing technical services in local government.

Surveyor cover 24 August 2006 featuring Edward Elgar.

The magazine has a history of more than one hundred years. It contains news and full-length articles on areas such as highways, traffic and transportation, planning, waste management and environmental control. It also carries recruitment advertising for the sector.

Despite its name, 'Surveyor' does not actually refer to the surveyors in the construction industry, but took its name from the old title of county surveyor, which is now referred to as Director of Technical Services in UK local authorities.

The magazine has close link to the County Surveyors Society, which was established officially at a meeting of eleven county surveyors for England on 19 November 1885.
