= Suomen Poikien ja Tyttöjen Keskus =

Finnish Evangelical Lutheran youth service organization

The Finnish Boys 'and Girls' Center - PTK Association (Finnish: Suomen Poikien ja Tyttöjen Keskus) is the service organization for early youth work in the Evangelical Lutheran Church of Finland. It is one of Finland's largest youth organizations. Through its member churches, the PTK reaches over 72,000 youth and 7,000 volunteer youth instructors in boys 'and girls' clubs, events and camps.

PTK's headquarters are located in the Partaharju Center of Action in Pieksämäki. There is also the Partaharju Opisto, founded in 1960, and a camp village founded in 1945.

The PTK is composed of 356 parishes and congregations and six organizations.

The organization organizes, among other things, instructor training, national and regional events, camps and hikes. It is also a lobbying organization for early youth and their families.

PTK publishes and distributes literature as well as other material such as ParAs craft material.

In addition to Partaharju, the organization owns the Tievatuva hiking center in Saariselkä.

Pastor Eero Jokela has been the Executive Director since 2007.

== See also ==
- Boys' Brigade - PTK's partner organisation in the UK.
