= County Surveyors' Society =

The County Surveyors' Society was established officially at a meeting of eleven county surveyors for England on 19 November 1885.

It was a society for people working in local government in highways departments in senior positions known as county surveyors.

Over time, most authorities stopped using the term 'county surveyor', but both the society and the magazine who support them, Surveyor magazine, opted to retain the title, although the society has since been subsumed (see reference to ADEPT below).

The first meeting, and many other early meetings, were concerned with conditions of service of surveyors, mainly pay and hours of work. However by 1890 the society had become increasingly involved with such matters as the rolling and watering of carriageways and repairs to footways.

The Development and Road Improvement Funds Act 1909 created a Roads Board, which later became the Department for Transport with powers to give grants to highway authorities (local authorities) to construct and maintain roads. Many meetings of the society at that time were concerned with these grants, attempting to ensure an even spread of money around England and Wales.

A Society of County Surveyors for Scotland was formed in 1931, although this was an extension of the earlier Association of Road Surveyors of Scotland founded in 1884, a year earlier than its English counterpart. In June 1937 it was agreed that they should join with their English and Welsh counterparts.

In 1937, a society delegation visited Germany and subsequently set out proposals in 1938 for a national motorway network, having been impressed with the work carried out by the then Nazi Government.

In 1955, with rationing that had hung over Great Britain since the end of World War II saw the end of the lean years of highway funding with the beginning of the motorway era, during which time the UK was transformed from a series of country lanes to having major 'A' routes and motorways, eventually including the M25.

Following the publication of the Buchanan Report in 1964, county surveyors became increasingly involved in transportation studies, traffic management and road safety, in addition to the existing work on road maintenance and new road construction.

The 1970s saw the start of the greatest road building programme since the days of the Turnpikes and also a major change in the structure of local authorities. The Society played a significant part in these changes and was accepted as a principal channel for initiatives and advice.

The 1974, reorganisation of local government added waste disposal to county surveyors' responsibilities. At the same time Surveyors of the Counties in Northern Ireland became part of the Department of the Environment, but in 1992 a Northern Ireland branch was formed which became part of the main society.

== Campaign for Safe Road Design ==
In July 2008, now using the shorter name CSS, the society remained a partner in the Campaign for Safe Road Design which was calling on the UK government to make safe road design a national transport priority. Since then, CSS has been subsumed by ADEPT, the Association of Directors of Environment, Economy, Planning and Transport.

== ADEPT ==
CSS changed its name to the Association of Directors of Environment, Economy, Planning & Transport (ADEPT) as a result of expansions in the responsibilities of the local government officers who were its members. The term 'county surveyor' had by then fallen from use.
