= Association of Road Surveyors of Scotland =

- Successor: Highway Engineers’ Association of Scotland (1924 - 1936); Institution of Municipal & County Engineers (1936 - 1984); Institute of Civil Engineers (ICE) (1984 - present)
- Established: 23 July 1884
- Founded at: Edinburgh, Scotland
- Dissolved: 1924; 102 years ago
- Location: Scotland

Association of Road Surveyors of Scotland (1884 - 1924) was a professional society in Scotland focused on infrastructure.

== History ==
The Roads and Bridges (Scotland) Act 1878 (41 & 42 Vict. c. 51) enhanced the profession of road surveyor by organising a list of statutory highways and processes of county administration. It began the move towards County-based responsibility for the roads network and bridges, assisted by the Local Government (Scotland) Act 1889 which established county councils.

Following the 1878 act, in 1884, around forty Scottish road surveyors decided to form an association with the object of 'the encouragement and advancement of all matters connected with road management, and to facilitate the exchange of information and ideas amongst its members; to fix places of meeting, and transact such other business as may be necessary'.

The first meeting of the new Association of Road Surveyors of Scotland was held in Edinburgh on 23 July 1884 with David Patrick of Dalry appointed the first President. Initially, there were 54 members. The association met annually and voted in a new president each year. There were two vice-presidents, an honorary secretary and treasurer, and honorary auditors. Meetings involved the reading of papers and discussion. There would also be trips to see bridges, roadworks, quarrying and new equipment in operation.

In 1888 Sir William Arrol showed the association the Forth Bridge under construction. In 1919 the Hon. Secretary and Treasurer Allan Stevenson retired after thirty-five years in the role. His position was taken by Major William Chapman of Airdrie.

In 1924 the association decided to change their name to the Highway Engineers' Association of Scotland. This reflected the engineering role many undertook.

In 1931 some members of the association decided to form the Scottish County Surveyors Society. Prior to the Local Government (Scotland) Act 1929 most surveyors had remained as district road surveyors with the county role only taken on by some authorities, notably Midlothian. The act brought in the widespread use of the county role. In 1937 the Scottish County Surveyors Society merged with the English and Welsh County Surveyors Society which had been founded in 1885.

In 1936 the Highway Engineers' Association of Scotland decided to merge with the Institution of Municipal & County Engineers. Part of the agreement required the Institution to include the phrase 'Incorporating the Highway Engineer's Association of Scotland' for three years thereafter. In 1984 the institution itself merged with the Institute of Civil Engineers (ICE).

== Presidents of Road Surveyors’ Association of Scotland ==
- 1884 – David Patrick, Dalry
- 1885 – Mr Clarke, Uddingston
- 1886 – William Mitchell, Dundee
- 1887 – William Rankin, Thornhill
- 1888 – John McLachlan, Dunfermline
- 1889 – David Laidlaw, Linlithgow
- 1890 – Alexander Hogg, Alford
- 1891 – Thomas Johnston, Hurlet
- 1892 – A.B Smith, Annan
- 1893 – William Ballantine, Falkirk
- 1894 – Archibald Wilson, Alexandria
- 1895 – Andrew Rankin, Airdrie
- 1896 – P.D. Alexander, Airdrie
- 1897 – R.M. Reid, St Ninians
- 1898 – R.S. Anderson, Peebles
- 1899 – Thomas Aitken, Cupar
- 1900 – W. Bell, Aberfeldy
- 1901 – Thomas Goodwillie, St Andrews
- 1902 – C.R. Manners, Inverness
- 1903 – Thomas Callen, Haddington
- 1904 – James B Roberton, Dundee
- 1905 – Roderick McDonald, Dalry
- 1906 – John Robb, Edinburgh
- 1907 – James Rennie, Shettleston
- 1908 – Robert Drummond, Paisley
- 1909 – Allan V. Hart, Dumfries
- 1910 – James Laing, Kilmarnock
- 1911 – Donald Ross, Kirriemuir
- 1912 – John Scott, Perth
- 1913 – James Watson, Strathaven
- 1915 – Peter Clarke, Dunbar
- 1919 – Colonel Forbes, Dunfermline
- 1920 – Allan Stevenson, Ayr
- 1921 – Major W.L. Gibson, Dunblane
- 1922 – George Donaldson, Kirkcaldy
- 1923 – George Wylie, Blairgowrie

== Presidents of Highway Engineer’s Association of Scotland ==
- 1924 – John Kirkland, Kirknewton
- 1925 – Roderick McDonald, Kilwinning
- 1926 – George Calvert, Haddington
- 1927 – Major Malcolm Heddie, Dunoon
- 1928 – M.B. McBeth
- 1929 – Hugh MacDiarmid, Dunfermline
- 1930 - William Hendry, Bridge of Weir
- 1931 – George S Barry, Ayr
- 1932 – John Schoolar, Stirling
- 1933 – William Kirkland, Crieff
- 1934 – T.A. Gourlay, Duns
- 1935 – William MacDonald, Oban
