= Boys' Brigade, Hong Kong =

The Boys' Brigade Hong Kong
- Type: Hong Kong Uniformed Youth Group
- Founded: 1959
- Headquarters: G/F, Block A, Lok Man Sun Chuen, To Kwa Wan, Kowloon, Hong Kong

Boys' Brigade, Hong Kong
- Traditional Chinese: 香港基督少年軍
- Simplified Chinese: 香港基督少年军
- Jyutping: hoeng1 gong2 gei1 duk1 siu3 nin4 gwan1
Transcriptions
Standard Mandarin
- Hanyu Pinyin: Xiānggǎng Jīdū Shàonián Jūn
Yue: Cantonese
- Jyutping: hoeng1 gong2 gei1 duk1 siu3 nin4 gwan1

The Boys' Brigade, Hong Kong (Chinese: 香港基督少年軍 Short-form: BBHK) is a branch of the Boys' Brigade. It is a Hong Kong Uniformed Youth Group (Chinese: 香港青少年制服團體) founded in 1959, currently has about 400 companies, of which more than 280 are active companies.

BBHK is a Christian uniformed group for children and teenagers aged 3 to 21. It provides a whole-person training to upbringing teens into leaders who can use their talent to create an energetic and harmonious society.

== History ==
BBHK was founded in 1959 by three British Christians— James Milner Fraser, Rev. Vernon N. J. Lowis, and Alfred Deans Peggs—who established the 1st Company at Union Church Hong Kong and the 2nd Company at the YMCA. Five years later, the 3rd Company was introduced to local Chinese children, and began spreading to the local Chinese churches. The Hong Kong Council of the Boys' Brigade was established in 1962 and was renamed The Boys' Brigade, Hong Kong in 1985.

In 1984, BBHK introduced its Non-Uniformed Group Services and secured government funding to establish a Children and Youth Centre. In 1986, it expanded its membership to include girls, and formed its first mixed-gender company, the 39th Company, within the Children and Youth Centre. To cater to the special needs of some youth groups, BBHK also established a company within a sheltered workshop and hostel for individuals with mental disabilities, introducing a new section called the Integrated Section.

In the 21st century, BBHK experienced significant expansion and growing social recognition, with an increasing number of companies and members.

== Core Services ==
BB was officially established in Hong Kong in 1959, starting with the uniform group. It has since expanded its core services as follows:

- Uniformed Group
- Training Service
- Character Nurturing Service
- School Social Work Service

=== Uniformed Group ===
==== Structure ====
BBHK is divided into seven sections, including six target groups and Officer:

- Anchor Lamb (Age 3-5 / Kindergarten Students)
- Pre-junior Section (Age 5-8 / K3-P3 Students)
- Junior Section (Age 8-12 / P4-P6 Students)
- Company Section (Age 11-18 / Secondary School Students)
- Senior Section (Age 16-21 / S4 Students or above)
- Integrated Section (People with special needs)
- Officer (Age 18 or above)

==== Leadership Training Course and Award Systems ====
BBHK's award system provides training for teenagers in various skills and areas of knowledge. The training programs include activities related to self-confidence, awards, attitudes, conduct, personal interests, and interpersonal skills.

- Explorative Badges for the Anchor Lambs Section
- Discovery Badges for the Pre-Junior Section
- Achievement Scheme for the Junior Section
- Proficiency Badges & Advanced Awards for the Company Section
- Senior Training Awards for the Senior Section
