= Boys' Brigade =

Oldest International interdenominational Christian youth organisation

- Founded: 4 October 1883
- Founder: Sir William Alexander Smith
- Location: Worldwide
- Origins: Glasgow, Scotland
- Region served: International
- Members: 750,000 worldwide
- Website: www.boys-brigade.org.uk

The Boys' Brigade (BB) is an international interdenominational Christian youth organisation, conceived by the Scottish businessman Sir William Alexander Smith to combine drill and fun activities with Christian values. Following its inception in Glasgow in 1883 the BB quickly spread across the United Kingdom, becoming a worldwide organisation by the early 1890s. As of 2018, the Boys' Brigade claimed 750,000 members in 60 countries.

The BB inspired the formation of other similar brigade organisations serving particular denominations, regions, genders, ideals, other religions or even individual churches, such as the Church Lads' Brigade (1891), London Diocesan Lads' Brigade and Church Girls' Brigade (all Church of England and later amalgamated into the Church Lads' and Church Girls' Brigade), the pacifist Boys' Life Brigade (formed 1899 by the National Sunday School Union with strongest support amongst non-conformist churches), the Girls' Brigade, the Girls' Life Brigade, Bolton Boys' Brigade, Catholic Boys' Brigade (1894), Baptist Boys' Brigade and the Jewish Lads' Brigade (1895), inspiring a whole brigade movement.

== Object, motto and emblem ==
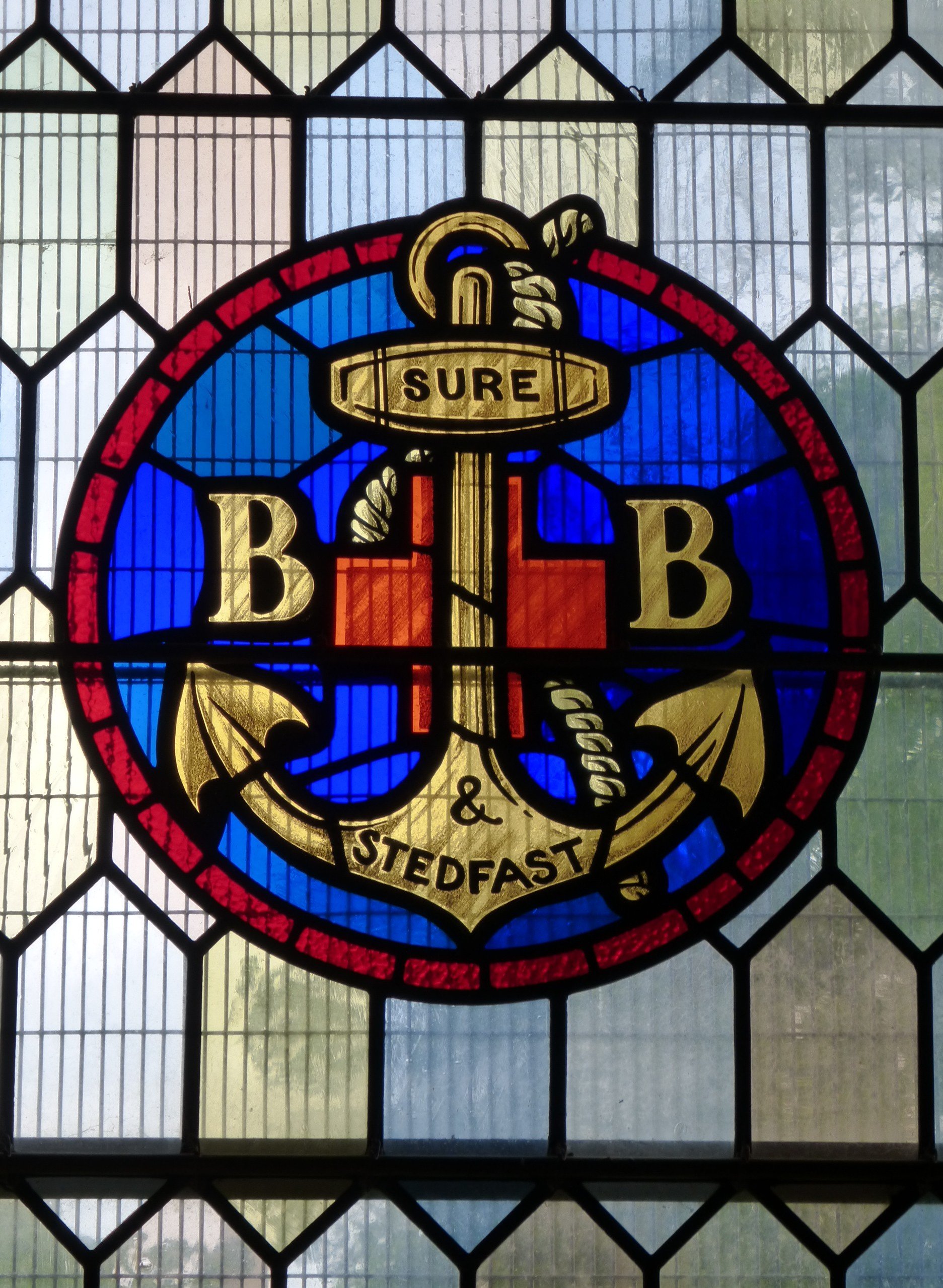
The Boys' Brigade emblem on a stained glass window in a parish church. It features the anchor and the motto, "Sure and Stedfast".

The object of the Boys Brigade is "the advancement of Christ's kingdom among Boys and the promotion of habits of Obedience, Reverence, Discipline, Self-respect and all that tends towards a true Christian manliness." Except for the addition of the word "obedience" in 1893, the contents of the object has remained unchanged from the beginning. However, some countries, particularly those which permit girls on their membership roll, have re-worded the object for gender neutrality. For example, in Malaysia, the word "manliness" has been changed to "character".

When designing the Brigade's motto and crest, William Smith referred directly to Hebrews 6:19 in the King James Version of the Bible, "Which hope we have as an anchor of the soul, both sure and stedfast...".

From this verse came the BB motto, "Sure and Stedfast", retaining the old spelling of the latter word. Today, some parts of the movement (only the UK and the Republic of Ireland) have adopted the modern spelling of "steadfast", whilst all others continue to use the older spelling.

The crest was originally a plain anchor, bearing the BB motto with a capital 'B' on either side. Upon the merger between the Boys' Brigade and the Boys' Life Brigade in 1926, the red Greek cross was placed behind the anchor to form the current emblem. The cross originally formed part of emblem of the Boys' Life Brigade.

== History ==
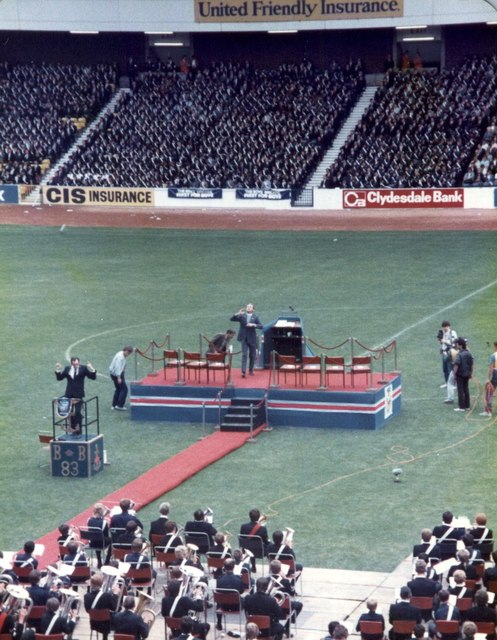
Boys Brigade Centenary Celebrations at Ibrox, Glasgow, 1 September 1982

The Boys' Brigade was founded in Glasgow by Sir William Alexander Smith on 4 October 1883 to develop Christian manliness by the use of a semi-military discipline and order, gymnastics, summer camps and religious services and classes.

By 1910, there were about 2,200 companies connected with different churches throughout the British Empire and the United States, with 10,000 officers and 100,000 boys.

=== Boys' Brigade Scouts, 1906–1927 ===
Companies of The Boys' Brigade used manuals on scout training in their programmes. In May 1903, Robert Baden-Powell became a vice-president. Baden-Powell promoted the idea of scouting and outdoor pursuits in the Boys' Brigade and other boys' organisations and schools. The Boys' Brigade formally began its boy scout scheme in 1906. Scout badges, Silver second class & Gold first class, were awarded in The Boys' Brigade.

There were specialised Boys' Brigade Scout sections, which operated as part of a BB Company. They met at different times to train in scouting, who wore khaki or blue uniforms, neck scarves and the distinctive four dented broad brimmed fur felt hats. Boys of the Bournemouth & Poole Battalion of The Boys' Brigade participated in Baden-Powell's experimental camp on Brownsea Island in 1907. Baden-Powell did not originally intend to start a separate organisation.

Many Boys' Brigade Scouts later made dual registration with The Boy Scouts Association. The 1st Bournemouth Scouts was run by the 1st Bournemouth Boys' Brigade as a 'BP' Scout group and never a 'BB Scout 'Section'. The Boys' Life Brigade, which merged with The Boys' Brigade in 1926, operated its own boy scouts and was a member organization of the National Peace Scouts with the British Boy Scouts.

The Boys' Brigade Scouts continued until 1927. Some former Boys' Brigade Scout units continued independently after 1927, or affiliated with The Boy Scouts' Association or British Boy Scouts. Two of the original Boys' Brigade Scout units continue as 1st Parkstone Scout Group and 1st Hamworthy Scout Group, both formerly sub units of the 1st Poole Boys Brigade.

=== Merger with Boys' Life Brigade, 1926 ===
In October 1926, The BB united with The Boys' Life Brigade. The Boys' Life Brigade was formed in 1899, as a pacifist alternative to the BB, by the National Sunday School Union and was strongest amongst non-conformist churches. It substituted first aid drill for the military and weapons drill used in the BB. The merger prompted the abandonment of weapons and dummy drill rifles that had been used in the BB, due to the Life Brigade's objections to use of weapons or their representations. The BB anchor badge was altered to include a red cross of the Boys' Life Brigade.

Prior to the amalgamation in 1926, the junior organisation of the BB was called 'The Boy Reserves'. After amalgamation, the juniors were called 'The Life Boys'. The name came from the fact that the junior reserve of The Boys' Life Brigade had been known as 'Lifeboys' (all one word). The Life Boys remained as the 'Junior Reserve of the BB until 1966, when the name was changed to 'The Junior Section'.

== Establishment of recreational camping ==
Drawing from his military experience, William Smith, Knighted in 1909, introduced the concept of camping into the Brigade to allow boys and officers to remain in contact when other activities ceased for the summer break.

The notion was initially ill-received due to concerns for the boys' safety. A mother was quoted saying, "Camp! My children have always had a roof over their heads, and as long as I live, always will!". They did have a roof over their heads because William Smith proceeded with the idea and 1st Glasgow Company held its inaugural one-week camp beginning on Friday, 16 July 1886, at Auchinlochan Hall, Tighnabruaich in a hall. In later years they took to canvas camping on a site at Portavadie in the Kyles of Bute.

The First Glasgow attended summer camp at the same location until the summer of 1974, when Portavadie was selected as the location of a proposed yard for the construction of oil production platforms. The new camp is located only 100 yards away at Stilliag farm. This camp site is now used by many companies of the BB every summer for their camping trip.

The initial reservations towards camping did not last. A tradition developed, where the boys who were marching home on the last day of camp would be greeted by cheers from residents and were each presented with a bouquet of flowers. Camps soon became one of the most anticipated events in the year and early publications of the Boys' Brigade Gazette contained many accounts of camping experiences.

Sir William Smith's plans and notes for his first camps have been preserved, and have been used by many other campers.

== Sections in the BB ==
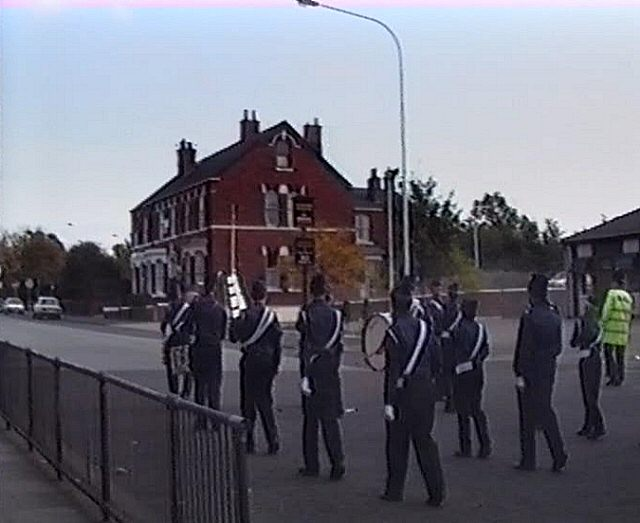
A Boys' Brigade parade in Ashton-under-Lyne, September 1992

Age groups are typically based on school years, so boys in the same year group would be promoted to the next section together, regardless of the dates of individual boys' birthdays. In some companies, sections may merge or there may be minor variations to the normal age boundaries, to accommodate excessively large or small groups of boys or a lack of leaders. Boys might also move to their next section before the end of the year to allow a smoother transition.

- Australia has three different age groups, known as "sections":
  - Anchors – 5 to 7 years
  - Juniors – 8 to 11 years
  - Seniors – 12 to 18 years
    - 'Alpha' – 12 to 14
    - 'Omega' – 15 to 18
- New Zealand has three sections:
  - Anchor - 5 to 7 years
  - Adventure - 8 to 10 years
  - Delta - 11 to 18
    - Delta Jr - 11 to 13
    - Delta Sr - 14 to 18
- Malaysia has four sections:
  - Pre-Juniors – 6 to 8 years
  - Juniors – 9 to 12 years
  - Seniors– 12 to 18 years
  - Primer– 18 to 21 years

(All Malaysian Boys' Brigade companies may accept girls into membership with the approval of their respective sponsoring authorities.)

- United Kingdom has four sections:
  - Anchor 5 to 8 years (companies need special permission to accept boys younger than 5 years old)
  - Juniors – 8 to 11 years
  - Company – 11 to 15 years
  - Seniors – 15 to 18 years

Officers company and over

(Companies may choose to run a Girls' Association alongside or in combination with these sections)

In the United Kingdom and Ireland The BB is divided into four Regions. Each region is then further divided. In Scotland and England & Wales The BB is divided into Districts and then Battalions. In Northern Ireland the BB is divided into 13 Battalions. The Battalions provide a local grouping of companies. The Battalions are normally based on Cities or Counties. Each Battalion has its own local structure that organises events and training on behalf of the member companies, each with its own Battalion President and Executive Team who assist the President in running the Battalion.

== Amicus Groups ==
- United Kingdom

Amicus was launched in 1994, and is intended to either run as an alternative to the Seniors programme or even without any other Boys' or Girls' Brigade sections operating. Unlike other sections which may be for boys only in many companies, Amicus is always run as a mixed-gender group. The Amicus concept emphasises involvement of all its members in decision-making concerning the running of the section, such as the content and whether a uniform is to be worn. The section is overseen and supervised by leaders aged over 18, who have received training from the Boys' Brigade and may deliver parts of the programme.

== Leadership ==
=== Officers (adult leaders) ===
Leaders in training are Warrant Officers, attaining the rank of Lieutenant after completing additional formal training in youth leadership. To avoid unnecessary leader hierarchy, all qualified officers are Lieutenants. The post of Captain of a company is a brevet rank. Those in the position revert to Lieutenant when they cease to be in the position. Similarly, other positions such as the company Adjutant (second to the captain), are considered appointments rather than substantive ranks.

Boys bearing the rank of Staff-Sergeant are non-commissioned officers, but act within the company as Officers.

=== Boys as non-commissioned officers ===
An older boy can gain promotion from Private to become a Non-Commissioned Officer (NCO). There are four NCO ranks available, each being awarded when a boy is of a certain minimum age and reaches a high enough standard of leadership:

- Lance Corporal – L/Cpl (minimum age 14)
- Corporal – Cpl (minimum age 15)
- Sergeant – Sgt (minimum age 16)
- Staff Sergeant – S/Sgt (minimum age 17)
- Warrant Officer – WO

NCOs often play an important role in the Boys' Brigade, helping the officers and other adult helpers with organising activities and awards classes, particular in the Anchors and Juniors sections. NCOs wear chevrons on their upper right arm.

Staff Sergeants act within the company as officers and do not stand in the ranks. As Staff Sergeants are boys of the Brigade, they can still partake in company activities and competitions, and still earn awards and badges. The uniform of Staff Sergeants is slightly different from that of the normal boy or NCO, they will still wear a blue shirt.

If caps are worn, the BB Anchor is used with no coloured surround. Their rank is denoted with an armband on the right forearm, with four inverted chevrons, similar to the rank badge historically worn by senior grades of sergeant in the British Army.

- United Kingdom

In England, Wales and Scotland, those aged 17 to 21 years old who are nominated by their company, may participate in The Boys' Brigade KGVI Youth Leadership Training. This consists of two one-week-long residential training experiences containing all the training needed to become an officer in The Boys' Brigade. KGVI is held at each of the Regional Headquarters (Felden Lodge in England/Wales and Carronvale House in Scotland.

In Northern Ireland, they have a young leadership programme called Step Up for young adults.

== Awards ==
Each section within the Boys' Brigade has awards that can be gained by fulfilling achievements.

=== Anchor Section ===
The Anchors can gain three badges: Green, Red and Blue triangles by completing a variety of activities in the areas of Body, Mind, Spirit, Community, and Creativity.

The Anchors award structure was revamped in 2020 and now have the following badges available: Anchors Membership Award, Core Awards of Yellow Award, Green Award, Blue Award and the Red Award.

=== Junior Section ===
The Juniors award scheme was revised in 2004 and members of the section can now gain the Junior Target Award, followed by Bronze, Silver and Gold awards, by completing a variety of activities in the areas of Body, Mind, Spirit, Community, and Creativity.

The Juniors award structure was revamped again in 2020 and now have the following badges available, Juniors Membership Award, Core awards of Bronze, Silver and Gold, and Project Awards of Get Active, Get Adventurous, Get Creative, Get Into The Bible, Get Involved and Get Learning. The Leading Boy/Girl Badges have also been replaced by Team Leader. This structure also sees the introduction of a "Nights Away" badge and can be awarded at 1, 3, 5, 10, 20, 30, 40, 50, 75 & 100 nights. This continues from the Junior Section through to the Company and Senior Sections.

=== Company Section ===
==== Get the Credit [Outdated] ====
Under the old 'Get the Credit' Scheme, Company Section members could gain one Target badge first (reduced from the required two in an award reorganisation a few years ago, though Target Two could still be completed as an optional extra), then five other badges (Interests, Adventure, Leadership, Physical and Community) with red and blue flashes around them.

After about three years, the boys would have gained all five badges with both red and blue flashes. This enabled the boys to attend a Leadership Training Course and potentially attain the President's Badge. This is a necessary prerequisite for the Brigade's highest award – the King's Badge.

==== Discover ====
In August 2007, the current award scheme for 11- to 15-year-olds, called Discover, was launched. The award scheme is built around three 'zones': Community; Recreation; and Skills. Badges may be gained at four Levels in each zone, 1 through 4.

Having spent two hours working on topics relevant to each of the three zones, a total of six hours, the member is awarded the Compass Badge.

The badge for a zone is gained when the required number of hours have been spent working on topics relevant to that zone (Community – seven hours; Recreation – 10 hours; Skills – 7 hours). A maximum of one badge per zone can be gained in a 12-month period (min 24 hours work). Any additional hours may not be carried over into the next 12-month period. In subsequent 12-month periods, members will work to gain Levels 2, 3, and 4 of each badge.

During a member's second year in Company Section they may gain the Discovery Badge, provided they have: gained a badge in all three zones within the last 12 months; completed an additional 6 hours work in any of the zones; taken part in a residential experience; played an active role in a Company, Battalion, or Church event; and had good attendance for the session.

The Discover programme includes the President's Badge, the requirements for which remain similar to those laid out in the 'Get the Credit' scheme. Including a 'Building Your Skills' Course
See images and logos at boys-brigade.org.uk.

==== Challenge Plus ====
The award scheme for Seniors (16- to 18-year-olds), is called Challenge Plus, and was launched in time for the start for the 2008/09 Session, and includes the King's Badge.

==== King's Badge ====
King's Badge is the highest award in the senior section in the UK and the Commonwealth; it is equivalent to a Founder's Badge. It requires those who complete it to do: A weekend away, Volunteering within the BB/ church for 3 months, Volunteering outside the BB/ church for 3 months, a Faith Journey, and two of: A physical skill for 6 months, developing a skill for 6 months, or a camping residential - the one completed for Silver Duke of Edinburgh Award counts, and attend a seminar discussing BB tropes, e.g. Leadership.

==== Founder's Badge ====
In non-Commonwealth countries, the Founder's Badge is used in place of the King's Badge. However, the Boys' Brigade in Malaysia and the Boys' Brigade in Singapore have chosen to use the Founder's Badge, although these countries are members of the Commonwealth.

==== President's Badge ====
President's badge is the second highest award in the senior section, it is also a requirement for members before undertaking the highest award which is Founder's badge. The title of Founder's Man and President's Man are held for life, recognizing all rounds of excellence in their service. The Badge itself may be worn while serving as a Non-Commissioned Officer (NCO), a Staff-Sergeant, or a Primer.

== International ==
=== Sovereign countries ===
Dates in parentheses indicate the year when the movement was revived after being dormant or defunct after the initial establishment.

==== Africa ====
Country	English Name	Local Name	Year Founded	Co-educational
Benin	The Boys' & Girls' Brigade, Benin	—N/a	1964	Yes
Burundi	The Boys' & Girls' Brigade of Burundi	—N/a	1964	Yes
Cameroon	The Boys' Brigade in Cameroon	—N/a	1958	Boys only
DR Congo ^{A}	The Boys' Brigade of Congo	Vijana Vya Maji Ya Uzima	—N/a	Yes
Ivory Coast	The Boys and Girls' Brigade of Cote d'Ivoire	Boys and Girls' Brigade de Cote d'Ivoire	1964	Yes
Eswatini	Christian Youth Brigade	—N/a	—N/a	Yes
Gambia	The Boys' Brigade in The Gambia	—N/a	1967	Boys only
Ghana	The Boys' Brigade, Ghana	—N/a	1910	Boys only
Kenya	Boys' Brigade Kenya	—N/a	1909	Yes
Lesotho	The Boys' Brigade of Lesotho	Lebotho la bahlankana	1979	Boys only
Malawi	The Boys' & Girls' Brigade in Malawi	—N/a	1910 (2007)	Yes
Nigeria	The Boys' Brigade Nigeria	Boys Brigade Nigeria	1908	Yes
Rwanda	The Boys' and Girls' Brigade in Rwanda	—N/a	1965 (1998)	Yes
Sierra Leone	The Boys' Brigade of Sierra Leone	—N/a	1928	Yes
South Africa	The Boys' Brigade of South Africa	—N/a	1889	Boys only
Tanzania	The Boys' Brigade in Tanzania	—N/a	1936	Boys only
Togo	The Boys' and Girls' Brigade in Togo	—N/a	—N/a	Yes
Uganda	The Boys' and Girls' Brigade of Uganda	—N/a	1933	Yes
Zambia	The Boys Brigade in Zambia	—N/a	1957	Boys only with Female Officers
Zimbabwe	The Boys' Brigade in Zimbabwe	—N/a	1948	Boys only
^{A} Originally called The Boys’ Brigade, the YOLW has had to gain a new identity due to political reasons.

==== America ====
Country	English Name	Local Name	Year Founded	Co-educational
Antigua and Barbuda	Boys' Brigade Antigua	—N/a	—N/a	Boys only
Bahamas	The Boys' Brigade Bahamas	—N/a	1909 (1944)	Boys only
Belize	The Boys' Brigade in Belize	—N/a	1936	Boys only
Brazil	The Boys' Brigade in Brazil	Batalhão de Bandeira	—N/a	—N/a
Canada	The Boys' Brigade in Canada; The Boys' & Girls' Christian Brigade in Canada	—N/a	1889; 2015	Boys only Yes
Caribbean Netherlands	The Boys' Brigade Sint Eustatius	—N/a	1946	Boys’ and Girls’ Companies
Dominica	The Boys' Brigade in Dominica	—N/a	—N/a	Boys only
Guyana	The Boys' and Girls' Brigade in Guyana	—N/a	1935	Yes
Grenada	Brigade Grenada	—N/a	—N/a	Yes
Haiti	The Boys' Brigade Haiti	—N/a	1957	—N/a
Jamaica	The Boys' Brigade in Jamaica	—N/a	1892	—N/a
Saint Kitts and Nevis	Saint Kitts and Nevis Boys' Brigade	—N/a	—N/a	Boys only
Saint Lucia	The Boys' Brigade in Saint Lucia	—N/a	—N/a	Boys only
(Saint Vincent and the Grenadines) SVG	The Boys' Brigade in Saint Vincent	—N/a	—N/a	Boys only
United States	United Boys and Girls' Brigades of America; Boys' & Girls' Brigade in Neenah; Boys' and Girls' Brigade of Brockton	—N/a	1887; 1900; 2011	Yes
Trinidad and Tobago	Trinidad and Tobago Boys' Brigade	—N/a	—N/a	Yes

==== Asia ====
Country	English Name	Local Name	Year Founded	Co-educational
Brunei	The Boys' Brigade, Brunei	Briged Putera Brunei	1964	Boys only
Cambodia	The Boys' Brigade, Cambodia	—N/a	2009	Yes
India ^{A}	The Boys' Brigade India	—N/a	1894 (2014)	Boys only
Indonesia	The Boys' Brigade in Indonesia	Putra Pengabdi Indonesia	1986	Yes
Malaysia	The Boys' Brigade in Malaysia	Briged Putera Malaysia	1946	Yes
Japan	The Boys' Brigade in Japan	ザボーイズブリゲードインジャパン	2019	Yes
Philippines	Boys' and Girls' Brigade, Philippines; The Brigade Philippines	—N/a	2004; 2010	Yes
Singapore	The Boys' Brigade in Singapore	—N/a	1930	Boys only
Thailand	The Boys' Brigade, Thailand	ยุวยาตรา ประเทศไทย	1994	Yes
Timor-Leste	The Boys' and Girls' Brigade, Timor Leste	Brigada Mane no Feto	2016	Yes
^{A} The earliest recorded BB Company in India was a united established in Darjeeling in 1894. Records indicate BB Companies being registered in Mumbai, Chennai, and Allahabad by the early 1900s and three Companies were registered in Kolkata from 1897 to 1902. The 2 Companies attached with the Victoria Leprosy Hospital in Dichpalle established in 1927 and 1932 continued to exist after the Independence of India, by which time most BB Companies in India have closed, until the 1960s. In 2014, BB work in India was re-established in Challapalli, Andhra Pradesh after an absence of almost 5 decades.

==== Australia / Oceania ====
Country	English Name	Local Name	Year Founded	Co-educational
Australia	The Boys' Brigade Australia	—N/a	1890	Boys only
Cook Islands	The Boys' Brigade, Cook Islands	—N/a	1935	—N/a
Fiji	The Boys' Brigade in Fiji	—N/a	—N/a	Boys only
Samoa	The Boys' Brigade in Samoa	—N/a	—N/a	Boys only
Solomon Islands	The Boys' Brigade in The Solomon Islands	—N/a	1960	Boys only
Tuvalu	The Boys' Brigade in Tuvalu	—N/a	1961	Boys only
New Zealand	Boys' Brigade New Zealand	—N/a	1886	Boys only
Papua New Guinea	The Boys' Brigade in Papua New Guinea	—N/a	1963	Yes
Tonga	The Boys' Brigade in Tonga	—N/a	—N/a	Boys only

==== Europe ====
Country	English Name	Local Name	Year Founded	Co-educational
Ireland	The Boys' Brigade in the Republic of Ireland	—N/a	1888	Boys only
United Kingdom	The Boys' Brigade in the United Kingdom	—N/a	1883	Yes

=== Non-sovereign territories ===
Country	English Name	Local Name	Year Founded	Co-educational
American Samoa	The Boys' Brigade in American Samoa	—N/a	—N/a	Boys only
Anguilla	The Boys' Brigade in Anguilla	—N/a	—N/a	Boys only
Aruba	The Boys' Brigade in Aruba	—N/a	—N/a	Boys only
Bermuda	The Bermuda Boys' Brigade	—N/a	1960	Boys only
British Virgin Islands	The Boys' Brigade in the British Virgin Islands	—N/a	—N/a	Boys only
Caribbean Netherlands	The Boys' Brigade in Sint Eustatius	—N/a	—N/a	Boys only
Cayman Islands	The Boys' Brigade, Cayman Islands	—N/a	—N/a	Boys only
Curaçao	The Boys' Brigade, Curacao	—N/a	—N/a	Boys only
Hong Kong	The Boys' Brigade, Hong Kong	香港基督少年軍	1959	Yes
Macau	The Boys' Brigade, Macau	澳門基督少年軍	1999	Yes
Niue	The Boys' Brigade in Niue	—N/a	1946	Boys only
Montserrat	Montserrat Boys' Brigade	—N/a	—N/a	Boys only
Sint Maarten	Boys' Brigade Sint Maarten	—N/a	1963	Boys only
United States Virgin Islands	The Boys' Brigade in the US Virgin Islands	—N/a	1961	Boys only

=== Affiliated Boys' Brigade type movements ===
Country	English Name	Local Name	Year Founded	Co-educational
Bangladesh	Pathway; N/A	N/A; Shishu Kishore Sangha	N/A; N/A	Yes
Denmark	Voluntary Boys' and Girls' Association	Frivilligt Drenge- og Pige-Forbund	1902	Yes
Finland	Young Church Movement	Nuori Kirkko	1919	Yes
India	Junior Ministry, ALC; Junior Ministry, TELC	N/A; N/A	N/A; N/A	Yes
Iceland	Youth League of the People's Church	Æskulýðssamband Þjóðkirkjunnar	—N/a	Yes
Malaysia	Junior Work, ELCM	—N/a	—N/a	Yes
Romania	Transylvanian Youth Christian Association	Erdélyi Ifjúsági Keresztyén Egyesület	—N/a	Yes

== See also ==
- The Boys' Brigade Australia
- The Boys' Brigade Hong Kong
- The Boys' Brigade Malaysia
- The Boys' Brigade in Singapore
- The Boys' Brigade in the United Kingdom and Republic of Ireland
- The Girls' Brigade
- Frivilligt Drenge- og Pige-Forbund, Boys' Brigade partner organisation in Denmark
- Suomen Poikien ja Tyttöjen Keskus, Boys' Brigade partner organisation in Finland
- Church Lads' Brigade
