= Boys' Brigade Gazette =

The Boys' Brigade Gazette is a quarterly magazine printed regularly since 1889 in the United Kingdom for the officers and leaders of the battalions and companies of the Boys' Brigade in the UK and Ireland.
