= The Monthly Register =

The Monthly Register and encyclopedian magazine was a British periodical published from 1802 to 1803 that was published by Charles and John Wyatt and edited by John Dyer Collier (1762–1825), the father of John Payne Collier, and Henry Crabb Robinson's essays on Kant – amongst the very earliest notices of Kant in England – appeared there.
