= Handy Shipping Guide =

- Editor: John Shingleton
- Categories: Freight, Shipping, Logistics, Drayage
- Frequency: Daily
- First issue: 1887
- Final issue: December 1988
- Company: Handy Shipping Guide
- Country: United Kingdom
- Language: English
- Website: www.handyshippingguide.com

The Handy Shipping Guide is an online magazine that in its current format provides news and an information directory catering to the international freight and logistics industry.

== History ==
The Handy Shipping Guide initially started in 1887 in London as a printed weekly source of information on vessels that were loading / unloading or else preparing to sail globally, the location of British registered ships as well as information on vessels that had cleared UK customs for departure and those that were about to enter bond. The publication also contained lists of vessels overdue.

The printed guide, which closed in December 1988, now provides historians with a critical research resource that provides economic and maritime data from an important period of history - from the height of the European Empires through to the rise of the United States and the towards the end of the Cold War. The National Maritime Museum in England holds a large collection of the original printed format which is accessible to researchers, though the collection is incomplete.

== Resurrection ==
On 22 May 2009 the Handy Shipping Guide resumed publishing in an online format. Now combining a service directory as well as its primary news page which aimed at a wider audience across the global logistics industry, the new Guide's first story reported the winning of "Mariner of the Year, 2009" by Captain Richard Phillips.

The new online magazine – or e-zine – started at an opportune time when the traditional freight press, still largely based around "hard-copy" publications, was struggling due to the effects of the Great Recession and the change in readers habits to web-based sources of information. As a result, it established itself well in the new market for digital information and has been consulted by the global mainstream press on stories and the News Archive has proved invaluable as a reference source to many journalists tracking the history of a particular story.
