= William Roberts (biographer) =

William Roberts (1767 – 21 May 1849) was an English barrister and legal writer, an evangelical journal editor and the first biographer of Hannah More.

== Life ==
William Roberts was born in Newington Butts. He was educated at Eton College, St Paul's School and Corpus Christi College, Oxford, where Thomas Burgess was his tutor. He gained his B.A. degree in 1788, and M.A .in 1791.

Roberts toured the Continent (including Paris) before returning to England and founding a short-lived biweekly journal, The Looker-on (1792–1793) under the pseudonym Rev. Simon Olive-Branch.

Entering the law, Roberts wrote several legal treatises. He married Elizabeth Anne Sidebotham, daughter of a Middle Temple barrister, who bore him ten children. From 1811 to 1822 he was editor of the British Review, and London Critical Journal, founded by the evangelical lawyer John Weyland and published by John Hatchard, an evangelical Tory publisher with offices at Piccadilly. When Canto I of Don Juan made the facetious claim that Byron had "bribed my grandmother's review — the British" to review the poem well, Roberts issued a solemn denial.

Roberts retired from the law to Surrey, and later to St Albans in Hertfordshire. His son Arthur Roberts wrote a biography in 1850.

== Works ==
- Memoirs of the Life and Correspondence of Mrs. Hannah More, 4 vols, London: R. B. Seeley & W. Burnside, 1834.

Roberts published his four-volume biography of Hannah More in 1834; it included extended extracts from More's letters. Its hagiographic tone and editorial inaccuracy drew the scorn of John Gibson Lockhart in the Quarterly. More's biographer Anne Stott wrote that the omissions and "improvements" made by Roberts were partially responsible for a view of More as an "unpleasant, authoritarian bigot".

Other works included:

- A treatise on the construction of the statutes, 13 Eliz. c. 5. and 27 Eliz. c. 4. relating to voluntary and fraudulent conveyances and on the nature and force of different considerations to support deeds and other legal instruments, in the courts of law and equity, London, 1800
- A treatise on the statute of frauds as it regards declarations in trust, contracts, surrenders, conveyances, and the execution and proof of wills and codicils : to which is prefixed a systematic dissertation upon the admissibility of parol and extrinsic evidence, to explain and controul written instruments, London: J. Butterworth, 1805
- A treatise upon wills and codicils with an appendix of the statutes, and a copious collection of useful precedents, with notes, practical and explanatory, 1809
- (anon.) The Portraiture of a Christian Gentleman. By a Barrister, London: J. A. Hessey, 1829. Republished under Roberts's name, 1831.
- History of Letter-Writing, From the Earliest Period to the Fifth Century, London: W. Pickering, 1843.
