= John Weyland =

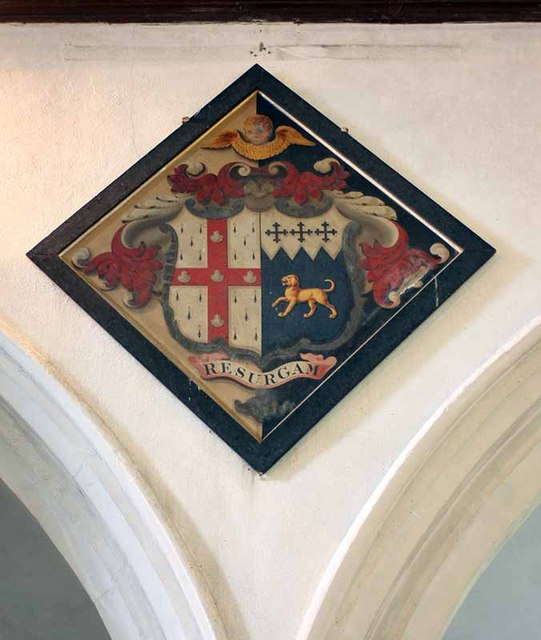
Hatchment in Holy Trinity Church, Scoulton, Norfolk, to John Weyland. Arms: Ermine, on a cross gules five escallops argent (Weyland) impaling: Azure, a talbot passant or on a chief indented argent three crosses-crosslet sable (Keene)

John Weyland (1774–1854) was an English writer on the poor laws and Member of Parliament.

== Life ==
Born on 4 December 1774, he was the eldest son of John Weyland (1744–1825) of Woodrising in Norfolk and Woodeaton in Oxfordshire, by his wife Elizabeth Johanna (d. 1822), daughter of John Nourse of Woodeaton. The MP Richard Weyland was his younger brother. He matriculated at Christ Church, Oxford, on 10 November 1792, and was called to the bar at the Inner Temple in 1800. He became a Fellow of the Royal Society.

Weyland founded the British Review and London Critical Journal with William Roberts in 1811, as a quarterly that appeared to 1825. Weyland after the initial issues handed over the editorship to Roberts. It took an evangelical Christian editorial line.

On 31 July 1830 Weyland was returned to parliament for Hindon in Wiltshire, and retained his seat until December 1832. He died, without issue, at Woodrising on 8 May 1854. On 12 March 1799 he had married Elizabeth, daughter and heiress of Whitshed Keene of Richmond.

== Works ==
Weyland studied the English poor-law system, and in 1807 published A Short Enquiry into the Policy, Humanity, and Effect of the Poor Laws, London. In it, and in a pamphlet published in the same year (Observations on Mr. Whitbread's Poor Bill and on the Population of England) he deprecated too much education for the poor, and stated that a certain degree of hardship was a necessary incentive to industry. He wrote also:

- A Letter to Sir Hugh Inglis on the State of Religion in India (London, 1813). John Scott-Waring replied to it.
- The Principle of the English Poor Laws, illustrated from the Evidence given by Scottish Proprietors (before the Corn Committee,) on the Connexion observed in Scotland between the Price of Grain and the Wages of Labour (1815).
- The Principles of Population and Production as they are affected by the Progress of Society (London, 1816).

He edited Robert Boyle's Occasional Reflections (London, 1808).

== Notes ==
Attribution

This article incorporates text from a publication now in the public domain: Lee, Sidney, ed. (1899). "Weyland, John". Dictionary of National Biography. Vol. 60. London: Smith, Elder & Co.
