= The Owl (magazine) =

The Owl: a Wednesday journal of politics and society was a satirical society newspaper published in London from 1864 to 1870. Irregularly published, but sometimes fortnightly, it cost 6d., was Tory in politics and consisted of a mix of satire and London society gossip.

The Owl was founded by Morning Post editor Algernon Borthwick, together with Evelyn Ashley, Lord Wharncliffe (1827–99) and James Archibald Stuart-Wortley.

The Conservative MP Alexander Baillie-Cochrane, 1st Baron Lamington was joint editor of the paper from 1864 to 1868. Contributors included the architect Arthur Ashpitel (1807–69), Disraeli's private secretary Montagu Corry, Laurence Oliphant, and Henry Drummond Wolff. They also included Mortimer Collins, Lord Houghton, Ralph Bernal Osborne, George Otto Trevelyan, and Thomas Gibson Bowles.
