= County surveyor =

Public official in the UK and US

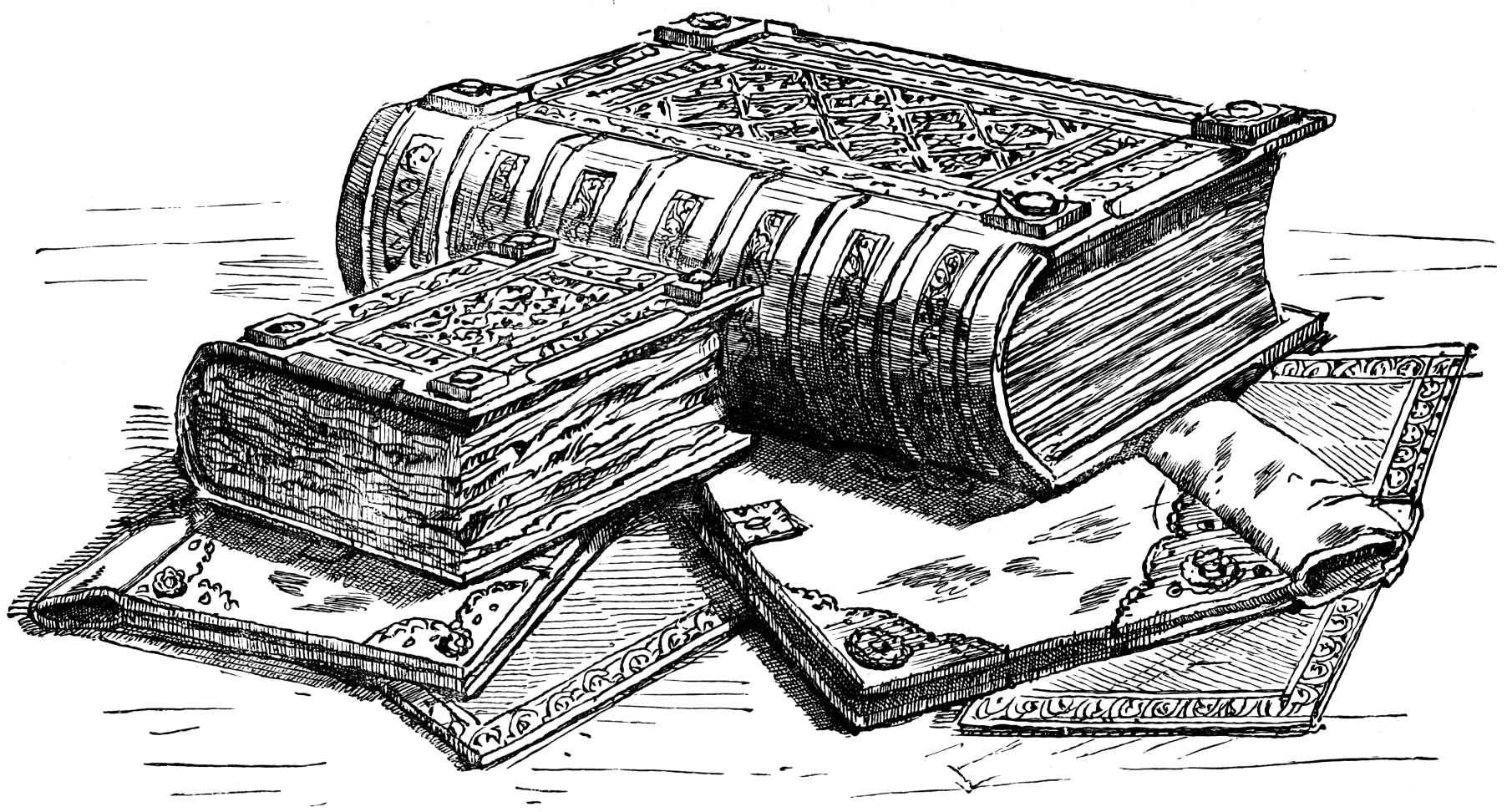
Domesday Book, England, 1086: Earliest historical record of 'county surveying' as an administrative function

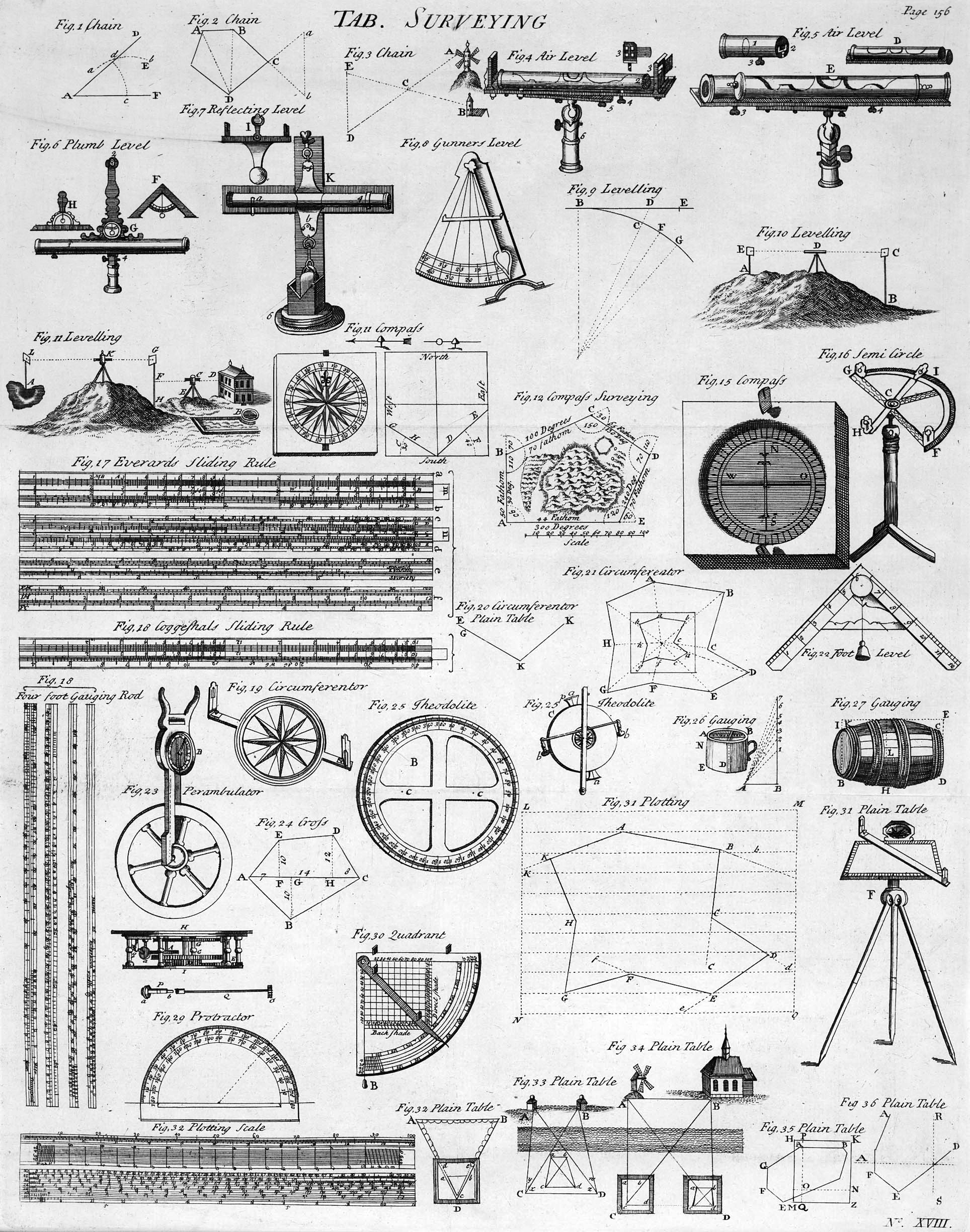
Table of Surveying, from the 1728 Cyclopaedia, Volume 2.

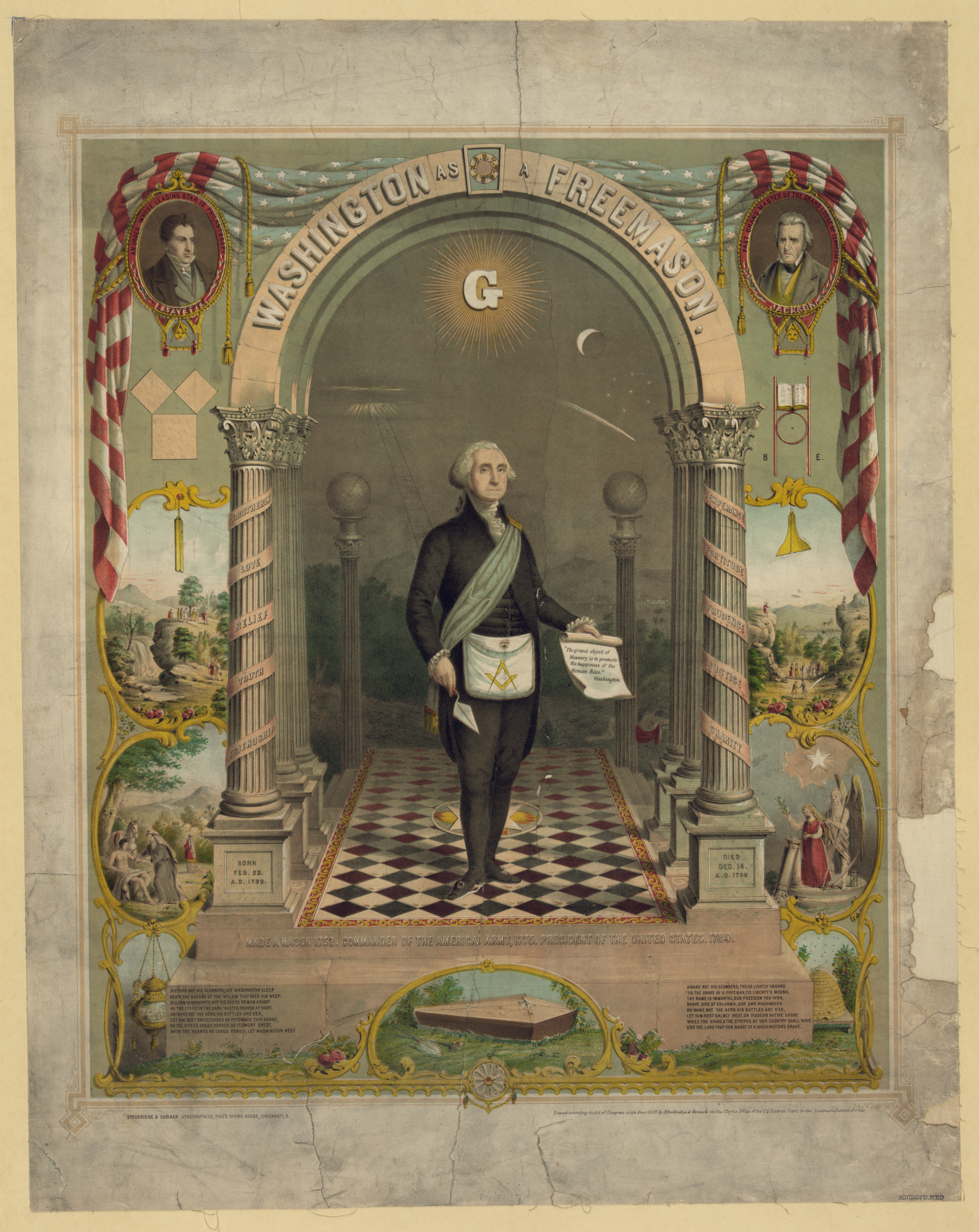
George Washington, freemason

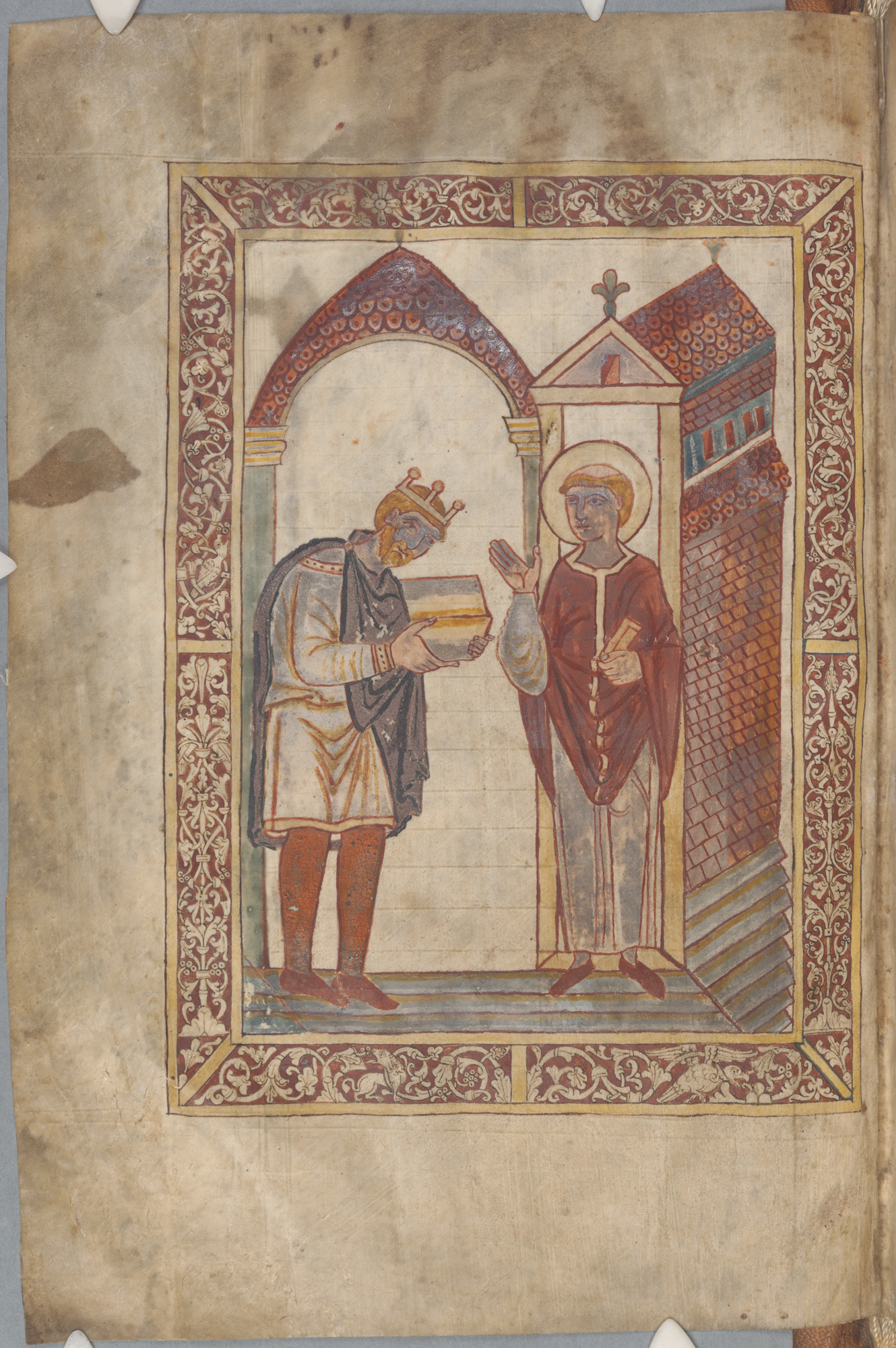
King Æthelstan and Saint Cuthbert

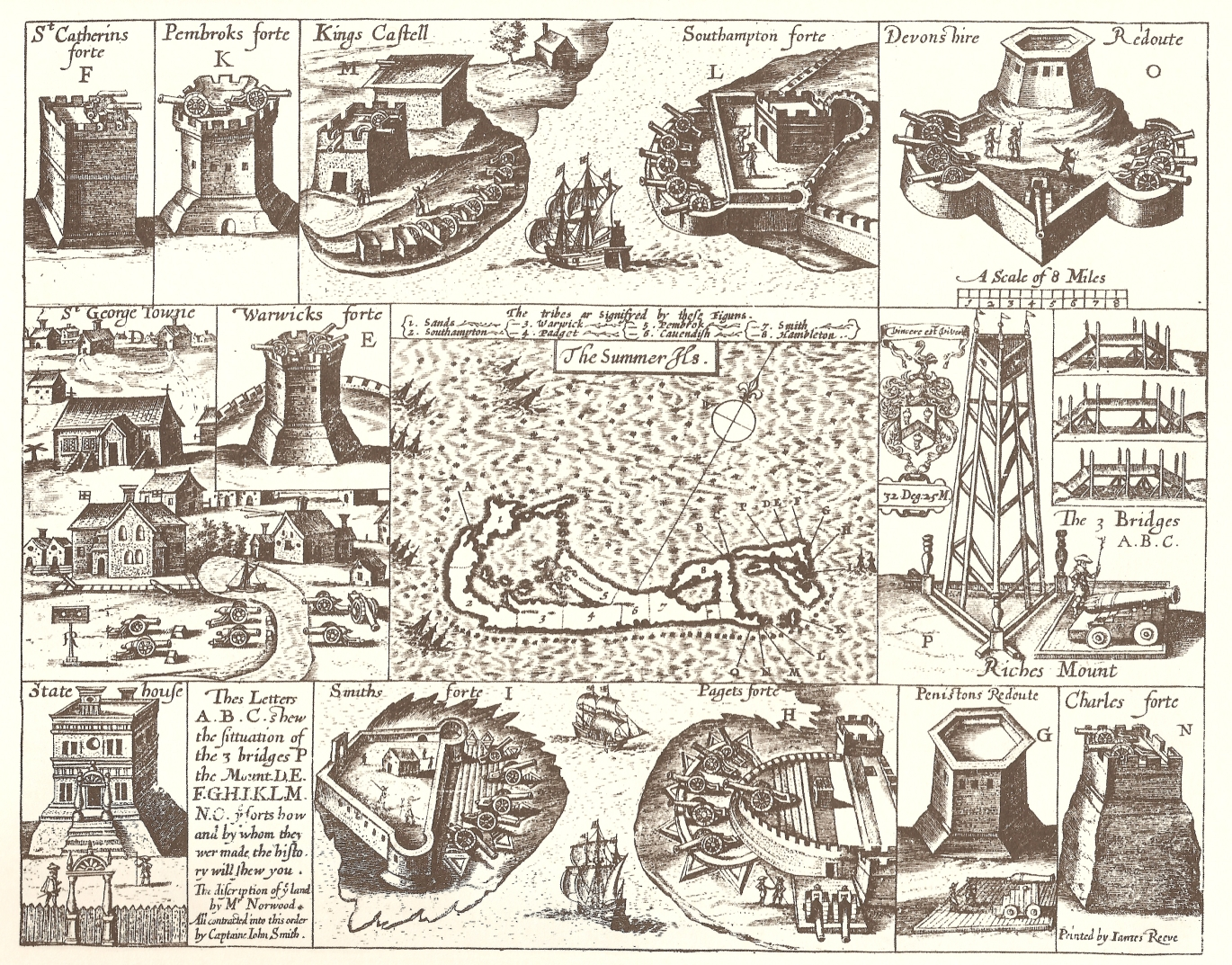
John Smith 1624 map of Bermuda

A county surveyor is a public official in the United Kingdom and the United States. County surveyors also existed in Ireland between 1834 and 1944.

== United Kingdom ==
Webb & Webb describe the increasing chaos that began to prevail within the 17th century in the field of county surveying in England and Wales, with county surveyors appointed by the justices of the peace at quarter sessions.

Eventually, the military defence component of county surveying in the UK began to separate from the civil in 1791, with the Crown's 'Board of Ordnance' being commissioned to carry out a comprehensive survey of the South Coast of England which, as a result of 'the last invasion of Britain 1797', at Fishguard in South West Wales ultimately extended to all of the UK.

With that shift in emphasis, county surveying began to concentrate more on its civil engineering and civic architecture roles, producing the historically famous British county surveyors such as Thomas Telford, John Loudon McAdam and John Nash; the expression, "county surveyor", became a UK statutory title (Bridges Act 1803); and, in England and Wales, its incumbents were appointed by elected county councils as of the coming into effect of the Local Government Act 1888 rather than being Crown-appointed by justices of the peace.

The UK equivalent of NACS, the County Surveyors' Society (CSS), founded in 1885, was transformed into the pluralistic Association of Directors of Environment, Economy, Planning and Transport (ADEPT) in 2010.

== United States ==
County surveyors are present in many counties of the United States. Most of these officials are elected on the partisan ballot to four-year terms. They administer the county land survey records, re-establish and maintain the official government survey monuments, and review property boundaries surveys and subdivision plans. Other duties vary from state to state.

NACS is part of the National Association of Counties of the USA (NACo).

=== History ===
The NACo website sets out its perception of the history of county government in the US, tracing it to Anglo-Saxon England (initial division of land into holdings for government purposes called 'shires', hence 'shire-reeve', the origin of 'sheriff'), Anglo-Norman feudalism (renaming shires conquered by William I as 'counties' and establishing his allodial title to them via the Domesday Book survey), and the increasingly "plural executive structure" commissioned by his successors to the royal throne of England to defend the peace and enforce the complex of chivalric, common, and statutory laws of England (and of Wales from the reign of Edward I) up to the time of the first county government established in America (County of James City, Virginia). This triad of origins is fundamental to understanding the organisation role that county surveying plays in the administration and development of the real estate of many states and nations around the world, even though sometimes it goes by other names. It was the framework that the King of England applied to his colonies in America and sufficiently successful as to have since been adopted by many other states.
