= Cheap Magazine =

The Cheap Magazine, subtitled "The Poor Man's Fireside Companion", was a fourpenny Haddington monthly published from 1813 to 1815 by George Miller (1771–1835), an East Lothian printer. As "one of the first attempts to diffuse a pure and useful literature among the less educated portion of Scotland", this effort foreshadowed later publications such as Chambers's Edinburgh Journal and the Penny Magazine. Yet a cheap price required a large circulation, and Miller's attempt to sustain a large readership without taking any definite religious position ended in financial failure.
