= William Alexander Smith (Boys' Brigade) =

Founder of the Boys Brigade (1854–1914)

Sir William Alexander Smith KBE
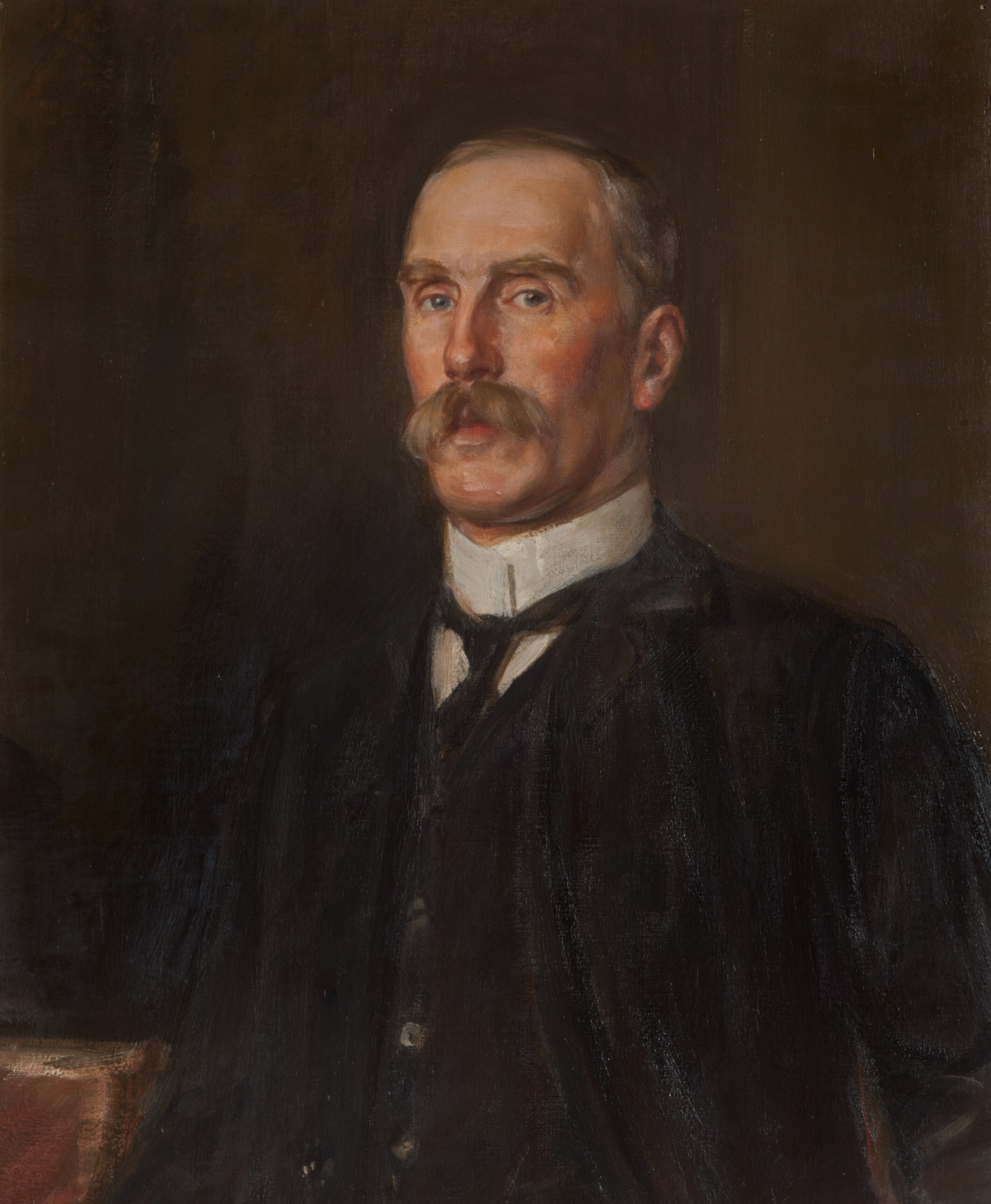
- Portrait c. 1910
- Born: October 27, 1854; Pennyland House Thurso, Scotland
- Died: May 10, 1914 (aged 59); London, England
- Burial place: Glasgow, Scotland
- Monuments: St Paul's Cathedral, London; St Giles' Cathedral, Edinburgh
- Education: Miller's Institute (Now Thurso Academy)
- Employer(s): 1st Lanarkshire Rifle Volunteers Smith, Findlay & Co,
- Organization: The Boys' Brigade
- Spouses: Amelia Pearson Sutherland (m. 1884; died 1898) Hannah Ranken Campbell (m. 1906; died 1907)
- Children: 2
- Awards: Knight Commander of the Order of the British Empire (KBE) by King Edward VII

Sir William Alexander Smith (27 October 1854 – 10 May 1914), the founder of the Boys' Brigade, was born in Pennyland House, Thurso, Scotland.

== Early life and education ==
Smith was born on 27 October 1854 at home in Pennyland House in Thurso, Scotland, within his family's ancestral estate. He was the eldest son of Major David Smith (1824-1868) and his wife Harriet (or Henrietta). He was one of five children: with older sister Katherine, two younger brothers, Donald (1856) and David (1860), and sister Henrietta (1864). His younger sister lived only three years.

His family had been involved in the military, with his grandfather, William, being in the 78th (Highlanders) Regiment of Foot in the Napoleonic Wars. His father had been in the Dragoon Guards in Southern Africa, becoming Major in the Caithness Volunteers when he left the army.

His parents were Christians, and they attended the local church regularly.

Smith was educated at the Miller Institution, known as the "Thurso Academy". There is now a building at Boys' Brigade Headquarters in Hemel Hempstead called the Thurso Centre.

Following his father's death, while on a business trip to China, when William was only 13, his family moved to Glasgow. This was less than a year after his sisters, Henrietta's, death. In early January 1869, he became a pupil in a private school, The Western Educational Institution, more widely known as "Burns' and Sutherland’s School". In his first and only term there, he took seven prizes. His time in the institution was short-lived as he ended his school days late in May, aged 14.

Nonetheless, Smith did not cease his education altogether. His writings in a notebook indicated that he continued to take French classes after joining his uncle's business.

== Late adolescence and adulthood ==
In October 1869, a few days before his 15th birthday, be began working in his uncle's business. Alex. Fraser & Co. were wholesale dealers in soft goods, shawls being one of their chief markets. Alexander Fraser was the brother of Williams's mother.

He later joined the 1st Lanarkshire Rifle Volunteers, part of the local Volunteer Force, and at the age of 19, he was promoted to the rank Lance-Corporal. He also joined the Church of Scotland in that same year.

On 5 March 1884, in Partick, Glasgow, he married Amelia Pearson Sutherland, who was the daughter of Rev. Andrew Sutherland, the Free Church of Scotland minister of Gibraltar. Two sons were to follow, George in 1889 and Douglas in 1891. Amelia died in 1898 in Partick, aged 40. With her death, William's sister, Kate, moved in to care for the young boys.

Smith was to marry again in 1906 to Hannah Ranken Campbell. She died the following year, on 20 July 1907, aged 51.

Smith was a keen amateur fisherman and sailor, and was a member of the Western Club of Glasgow. He became an Honorary Colonel of the Lanarkshire Rifle Volunteers, and retired from that role in 1908.

== Boy's Brigade ==
Smith was commissioned into the Rifle Volunteers in 1877 and promoted to Lieutenant later the same year. He also became a Sunday School teacher. It was a combination of these two activities that led him to found the Boys' Brigade on 4 October 1883 at the Free Church Mission Hall, North Woodside Road, Glasgow. He had realised there needed to be an organisation based on Christian principles which could provide focus for the boys.

By 1887, he was full-time Secretary of the Brigade, at a salary of £350 per annum. The movement spread rapidly, and soon Brigades were being set up far beyond the UK in Canada and the USA.

In 1909 he was knighted by King Edward VII for his services to children. He reached the rank of Honorary Colonel in the Lanarkshire Rifle Volunteers.

== Death ==
In early May 1914, Smith was in London to attend the London District Display at the Royal Albert Hall and for a meeting of the Brigade Executive. However, during this meeting on 8th May, he suddenly collapsed. He was transferred to St Bartholomew’s Hospital, where he died at 6:30am on the 10th May 1914.

There was a service of memorial held in St Paul's Cathedral on 15th May 1914, before a funeral service back in his home Church in Glasgow at Kelvingrove United Free Church on Saturday 16th May. After the service in Glasgow, two Sergeants from the 1st Glasgow slow marched all the way to the Glasgow Western Necropolis cemetery where he is buried. After the committal all the Boys of the Company walked past in single file and each Boy dropped a white flower into the open grave. A memorial service was also held in St Andrew's Hall in Glasgow on 17th May.

There is a memorial stone in honour of him in St Paul's Cathedral, London, and in St Giles' Cathedral, Edinburgh. There is also a Memorial Plaque in Glasgow Cathedral, it is at the Northwest corner of the nave.

== See also ==
- Muscular Christianity
