= Sunday magazine (disambiguation) =

A Sunday magazine is a publication inserted into a Sunday newspaper.

Sunday magazine or The Sunday Magazine may also refer to:

- The Sunday Magazine (radio program), airing on CBC radio
- The Sunday Magazine (magazine), published 1864–1905
- Sunday reading periodical, a magazine genre in Victorian Britain

== See also ==
- Sunday (magazine)
