= Kortright =

Kortright is a surname. and may refer to:

- Anne Marie Kortright (born 1982), Puerto Rican fashion model
- Charles Kortright (1871–1952), English cricketer
- Cornelius Hendricksen Kortright (1817–1897), British civil servant, Governor of British Guiana.
- Elizabeth Kortright, married name Elizabeth Monroe (1768–1830), First Lady of the United States from 1817 to 1825, as the wife of James Monroe
- Frances Kortright (1821–1900), British writer and anti-suffragist

== See also ==
- Kortright, New York
