= Sunday reading periodical =

Magazine genre

Sunday reading was a genre of periodical popular in Victorian Britain which offered light Christian reading thought to be suitable for families to read at home on Sundays. Typical examples such as Sunday at Home, The Quiver, and Leisure Hour featured a mixture of fiction, non-fiction, and verse, all dealing in some way with Christian themes.

The genre was partly a reaction to the rise of cheaply available secular publications, which some observers considered to be morally insidious. It declined around the beginning of the 20th century as social taboos around consuming secular entertainment on the Sabbath weakened.

== Content ==
Sunday reading magazines contained a mixture of fiction, non-fiction, and verse, though contributions generally all featured an overtly Christian perspective. Fiction, which included short stories and serialized novels such as Jessica's First Prayer (serialised in 1866 in Sunday at Home), typically carried clear moral lessons. Editors justified the inclusion of fiction by comparison with the parables of Jesus. Toward the end of the 19th century, publications became increasingly willing to feature sensational secular fiction. For example, by the 1890s, The Quiver was publishing stories by authors like Baroness Orczy and H. Rider Haggard.

== Audience ==
Rather than aiming to proselytize to the masses, Sunday periodicals were largely intended to provide suitable Sunday entertainment for families which were already devoutly Christian. Victorian society was known for its sobre attitude toward the Sabbath. For example, the illustrator Ernest Shepard recalled that as a child he and his brother were prevented from playing with toys, and that their reading options were limited to religious Sunday periodicals: "No old Punch or Illustrated London News volumes to look at: instead The Sunday Magazine, Leisure Hour, and Sunday at Home..."

Sunday reading periodicals competed with, and were partly a reaction to, a variety of inexpensive secular periodicals which began to appear in the 1840s, such as The London Journal, The Family Herald, Lloyd's Weekly, and Reynold's Miscellany. These were typically priced at a single penny, leading to the epithet "penny weeklies".

An 1859 issue of the London Review reported on a survey of periodicals stocked by London coffee-houses undertaken by the Pure Literature Society. They found 171 houses which stocked The Leisure Hour and 34 which stocked Sunday at Home, both being Sunday reading magazines approved by the Society. They also found that 259 houses kept periodicals which the Society deemed "objectionable", such as The London Journal and The Family Herald.

The market for Sunday periodicals declined around the beginning of the 20th century as it became more socially acceptable to partake in secular entertainment on the Sabbath. In 1899, the annual report of the Religious Tract Society, which published multiple Sunday periodicals, stated that their publications "have to fight more or less for very life", and that "every year makes their way more difficult".

== List of periodicals ==
Title	Year of first issue	Notes
Leisure Hour	1852	Published by the Religious Tract Society.
Sunday at Home	1854	One of the most successful Sunday periodicals. Published by the Religious Tract Society. Published in weekly, monthly, and annual formats.
Good Words	1860	Published by Alexander Strahan and initially edited by Reverend Norman Macleod.
The Quiver	1861	Published by John Cassell.
The Sunday Magazine	1864	Published by Alexander Strahan and initially edited by Scottish preacher Thomas Guthrie.
Sunday Reader	1866	Published in weekly and monthly editions. The weekly edition was initially priced at 2 pence, but soon reduced to 1 penny to match competitors. Edited by John C. Miller, vicar of Greenwich. Appears to have lasted only around a year.
Christian World		Published by the Religious Tract Society.
Christian Miscellany		
Monthly Magazine		
