= Dovaston =

Dovaston is a surname. Notable people with the surname include:

- John Freeman Milward Dovaston (1782–1854), British poet and naturalist
- Margaret Dovaston (1884–1954), British painter
