= Edith Stewart Drewry =

- Born: 1841; London
- Died: September 30, 1925; London
- Occupations: Novelist, music critic
- Father: Charles Stewart Drewry
- Relatives: Georgina Drewry, Laurentia Drewry

Edith Stewart Drewry (1841 – 30 September 1925) was a British novelist.

== Biography ==
Edith Stewart Drewry was born on 1841 in London, the daughter of Charles Stewart Drewry, an engineer turned barrister, and Laurentia Buschman Drewry. Her sisters Georgina, Laurentia, and Emily became writers as well. Her first novel was Baptized with a Curse (1870), followed by a number of others, including Only an Actress (1883), which follows the stage actress Marghertia La Mara. She published stories and serialized novels in a number of magazines, including Belgravia, The Family Herald, and The London Journal. One of these stories was "A Twin-Identity" (Belgravia Annual 1891), narrated by the female French police detective Marie Lacroix, who is assisted by the spirit of a woman to catch the murderer of the woman's twin sister. Drewry was also a music reviewer for the Musical Standard from 1874 to 1880.

Edith Stewart Drewry died on 30 September 1925 in London.

== Bibliography ==
- Baptized with a Curse: A Novel. 3 vol. London: Tinsley Brothers, 1870.
- Sworn Foes, and The Skeleton on the Hearth. 1 vol. London: William Stevens, 1879.
- A Death Ring. 2 vol. London: W.H. Moor and Co., 1881.
- On Dangerous Ground: A Novel. 3 vol. London: F. V. White, 1883.
- Only an Actress: A Novel. 3 vol. London: F. V. White, 1883.
- For Somebody's Sake: A Novel. 3 vol. London: F. V. White, 1890.
