= Mary Hay =

Mary Hay may refer to:

- Mary Hay, 14th Countess of Erroll (died 1758)
- Mary Hay (actress) (1901–1957), American dancer, actress, playwright and former Ziegfeld girl
- Mary Garrett Hay (1857–1928), American suffragist
- Mary Cecil Hay (1840/41–1886), English novelist
