= The Metropolitan Magazine =

London monthly journal

The Metropolitan: A monthly journal of literature, science, and the fine arts was a London monthly journal inaugurated in May 1831, originally edited by Thomas Campbell. It was then published by James Cochrane.

The Metropolitan Magazine was issued in three annual volumes of four monthly issues through May 1850, number 229, the first issue of volume 58. After one year, it was published by Saunders and Otley of Conduit Street for 15 years from May 1832 to April 1847 (volumes 4–48).

== Editors ==
Campbell and Cyrus Redding were the first editors of the Metropolitan. Frederick Marryat became editor in 1832. From vol. 6 (1833) onwards the magazine went under the name The Metropolitan Magazine. Marryat appointed the novelist Edward Howard (1793–1841) as a sub-editor in 1833: Howard serialized his semi-autobiographical Life of a Sub-Editor in the Metropolitan in 1834. Though Marryat resigned the editorship in 1835, he kept a connection with the Metropolitan for another year.

== Contributors ==
Contributors included the poet and novelist James Hogg (1770 - 1835), who lodged with Cochrane and worked in the magazine's office during his time in London in 1832, the poet Maria Abdy (c. 1800–1867), the novelist and poet Isa Blagden (1816/17–1873), Eliza Cook, Antonio Gallenga, the mesmerist Spencer Timothy Hall (1812–1885), Hargrave Jennings (1817?–1890), the philosopher Thomas Charles Morgan (c. 1780–1843), and the poet and novelist Annie Tinsley (1808–1885). Frederick Crouch, musician and composer (1808–1896), was the music reviewer until he emigrated to the United States in 1849. The magazine ceased publication in 1850.
