= Sunday at Home =

British christian weekly magazine (1854 - 1940)

Sunday at Home; a family magazine for Sabbath reading
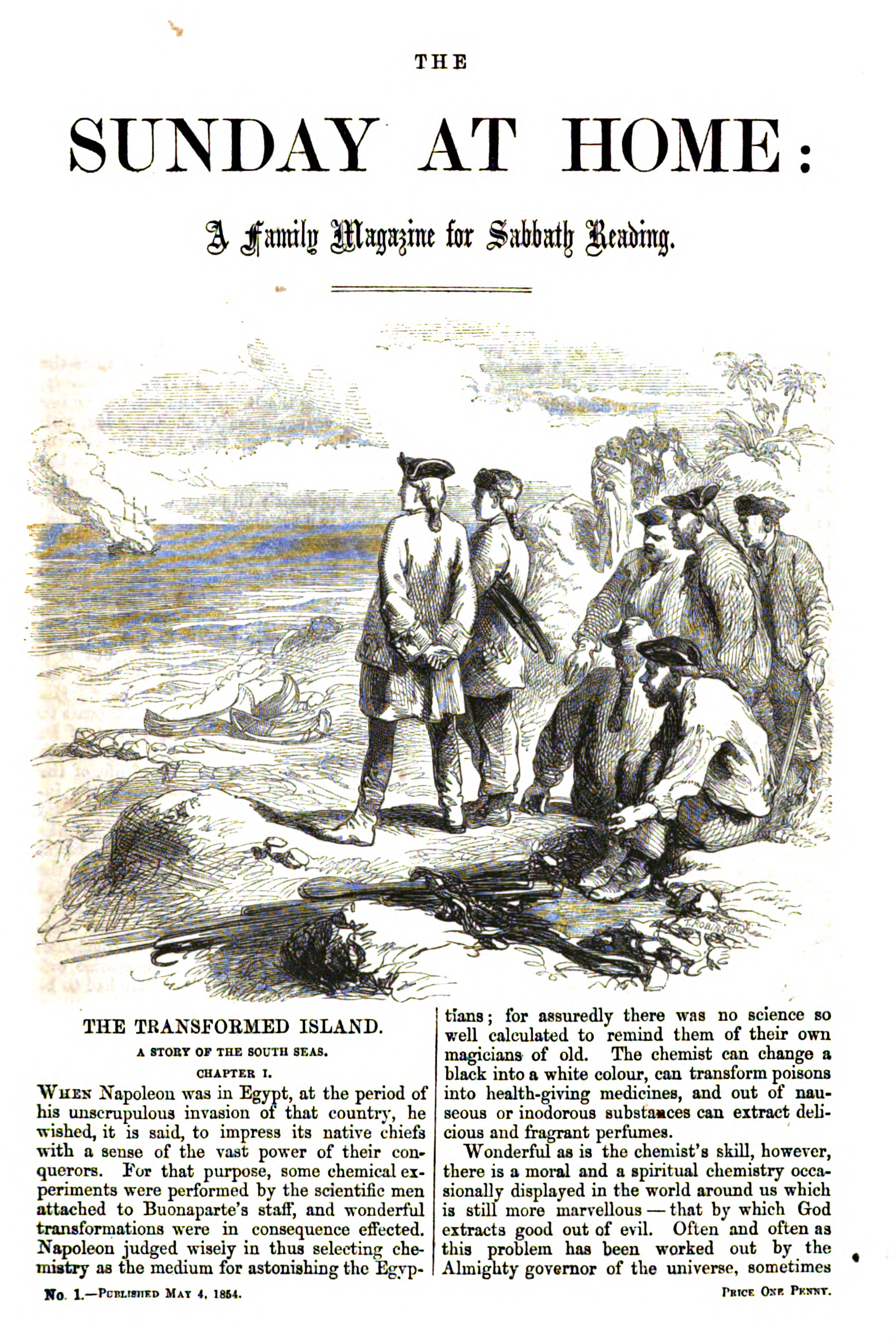
- Cover of the first issue of Sunday at Home
- Publisher: Religious Tract Society
- First issue: May 1854
- Final issue: 1940

Sunday at Home was a weekly magazine published in London by the Religious Tract Society beginning in 1854. It was one of the most successful examples of the "Sunday reading" genre of periodicals: inexpensive magazines intended to provide wholesome religious (or religiously inspired) entertainment for families to read on Sundays, especially as a substitute for "pernicious" secular penny weeklies such as The London Journal or The Family Herald.

It was initially edited by James Macaulay, and later by W. Stevens. Macaulay and Stevens also edited The Leisure Hour, a similar periodical which debuted two years earlier and was also published by the Religious Tract Society, though Sunday at Home was more overtly religious and had a more strongly Sabbatarian viewpoint. Like The Leisure Hour, a typical issue of Sunday at Home led with a serialized piece of religious fiction, and included at least one large illustration.

In addition to the penny weekly format, the magazine was issued in monthly parts at a price of five pence (raised to 6p in 1863), and annual volumes ranging in price from around 5 to 10 shillings.

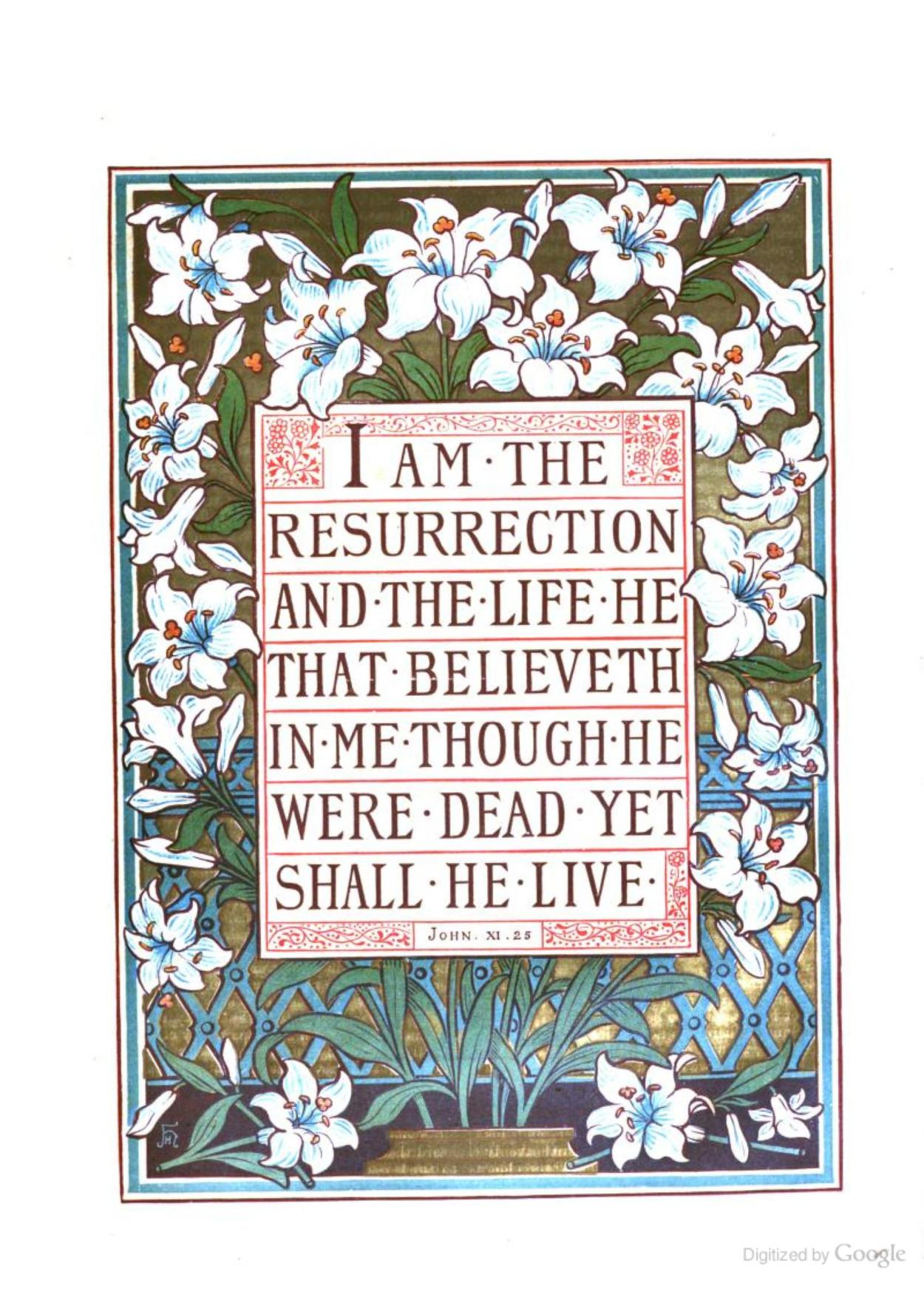
An example of a page with colour illustrations from an 1883 issue. The text of the Bible verse John 11:25 is illuminated with lilies and other decoration.

In 1862, the magazine began including colour illustrations, apparently the first penny weekly to do so.

In 1865, the magazine had an annual circulation of 130,000 copies, which increased steadily up to 1875.
