= Elizabeth Hely Walshe =

Irish writer

- Born: 1835; Limerick
- Died: 1869 (aged 33–34); Isle of Wight

Elizabeth Hely Walshe (1835–1869), was an Irish writer of children's stories and histories.

== Life ==
Elizabeth Hely Walshe was born in 1835 in Limerick, Ireland to an evangelical Protestant family. Her father was a clergyman and she had at least one sister. She lived in Canada for some years but was back in Ireland by 1865. She was an accomplished artist and musician. She worked as a Sunday-school teacher. She also believed in the education of the poor. Walshe was a regular contributor to Leisure Hour Magazine and Sunday at Home. She also worked with George Etell Sargent on stories for children. Like many writers of that era the Irish Famine has an impact on the themes of her stories.

Walshe was on the Isle of Wight in 1869 when she died of consumption.

== Bibliography ==
- Cedar Creek (1863)
- Story of the faith in Hungary
- From dawn to dark in Italy (1865)
- Golden Hills (1865)
- The Manuscript Man (1869)
- The Foster-Brothers of Doon: A Tale of the Irish Rebellion of 1798 (1890)
- Within sea walls, or, How the Dutch kept the faith
- Kingston's revenge: a story of bravery and single-hearted endeavour
