= Nina Moore Jamieson =

Writer, lecturer, poet and journalist

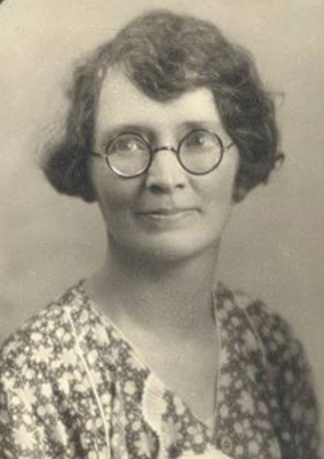
- Born: Nina Auchinleck Moore; 29 April 1885; Hollywood, Belfast, Northern Ireland
- Died: 6 November 1932 (aged 47); Brant, Ontario

Nina "Pat" Moore Jamieson (29 April 1885 – 6 November 1932) was an Irish-born Canadian teacher, journalist, poet and lecturer.

== Life ==
She was born near Belfast, Ireland, in 1885. Her parents William Francis Moore and Georgette Robinson were Canadian and took her back to Canada. She grew up in Cookstown and Dundas, Ontario. Jamieson attended Hamilton (Ontario) Model School and got training in domestic science. She became a teacher, following in her father's line of work. But she worked for several years before getting her qualifications from the Winnipeg Normal school. She was known as Pat to her family and friends. On 23 October 1907 Jamieson married farmer Norman Jamieson and they had four children. She worked for the Ontario Department of Agriculture. Jamieson spent time lecturing to Women's Institutes and the Imperial Order Daughters of the Empire.

During the First World War, encouraged by her mother and husband, Jamieson began to send her work to The Mail and Empire; she became a columnist there. She also contributed to Business Woman, Family Herald, Montreal Weekly Star, Ontario Farmer andToronto Star Weekly. She managed to publish two volumes of verses and sketches, one before she died, one was arranged by family and friends after her death. Her final book, The Golden Shackle, was never published. Jamieson died of breast cancer in 1932. She is buried at St. George Cemetery in Ontario.

In 2006, her life was turned into a one-woman play created by Joann MacLachlan, performed by Maja Bannerman and premiered in the Cobblestone Play Festival in Paris, Ontario.

== Bibliography ==
- The Hickory Stick (1921)
- The Cattle in the Stall (1932)
