= Annie Tinsley =

British novelist and poet

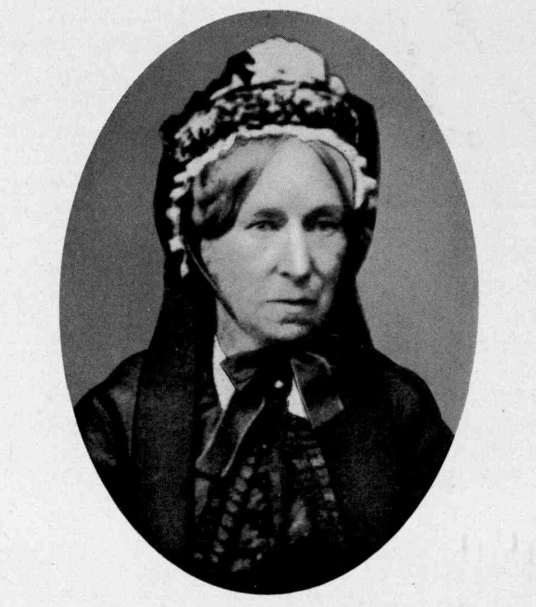
- Born: 11 January 1808; Preston, Lancashire, England
- Died: 20 January 1885 (aged 84); Gravesend, Kent, England
- Other names: Mrs Charles Tinsley
- Spouse: Charles Tinsley

Annie Tinsley, born Annie Turner (11 January 1808 – 20 January 1885), was a British novelist and poet. She used the name Mrs Charles Tinsley.

== Life ==
Tinsley was born in Preston in 1808. She claimed to have read "the classics" at an early age and she published her first set of poetry at her own risk in 1826. The collection was called The Children of the Mist and other Poems and it bore the date of 1827. The publication made a loss and even although she was still a child in the eyes of the law she could have been sent to prison, albeit illegally. However she met her husband Charles Tinsley and they married. Usefully he was a solicitor but he was a poor one. Tinsley had to turn herself into a hack writer to raise funds. She said that she was so desperate that she did not check her work, but just moved on to the next task. She ignored poetry and wrote for periodicals including Family Herald, the Monthly Chronicle, the Metropolitan Magazine, People's Journal and the Literary Gazette.

Her best work is thought to be her 1848 collection of poems, Lays for the Thoughtful and Solitary which exposed her thoughts on the poor position of women in civilization's hierarchy.

In 1853 she published her novel Margaret and the preface had to point out that it was written before Charlotte Brontë's novel Villette as it was published in the same year and there were similarities. The following year she published the more original book Women as they are. By one of them which expanded on her own previous theme from 1848 that women should look to their own abilities. She now knew from her own experiences of relying on her father and now her husband that reliance could lead to disappointment. She and her husband moved frequently to try and find a job that suited him.

Eventually her husband's precarious finances were solved by an inheritance, but her own peace failed to materialise as her favourite child, George Herbert Tinsley, died of Typhoid in 1877. She died in 1885 and was buried as a Catholic near her home which was in Gravesend.

== Death and legacy ==
Her biography was recorded in Miscellaneous Antiquarian Papers by Henry Peet in 1930. He had presented it to the Transactions of the Historic Society of Lancashire and Cheshire in 1929.

== Publications include ==
- The Children of the Mist and other Poems (1827)
- Margaret (1853)
- Eunice (1854) serialised in the Family Herald
- Women as They Are (1854)
- The Heiress of Barren Court (1855), serialised in the Family Herald and the Metropolitan Magazine
- Darkest Before Dawn (1864)
