= J. G. S. B. Bohn =

British bookseller and bibliographer

James George Stuart Burges Bohn (20 December 1803, London – 4 January 1880, Peckham) was a British bookseller and bibliographer.

== Family ==
Bohn was son of John Bohn, a London bookseller, who died on 13 October 1843, in his eighty-sixth year. The translator and publisher Henry George Bohn (1796–1884) was his brother.

== Bookseller ==
After an education at Winchester, James was sent to Göttingen to perfect himself in German and French. He helped his father for some years, but in February 1834 started bookselling on his own account at 12 King William Street, Strand. Here his great knowledge of books soon attracted many customers, and his shop became a meeting-place for some of the most learned men of the day. In 1840 he published a 792-page catalogue: its contents included nearly complete lists of the works of Gilbert Burnet, Daniel Defoe, Thomas Hearne, and Joseph Ritson.

== Family Herald ==
Bohn was not successful at that location and, in 1845, had to start again at 66 St. James's Street. Here he republished William Dugdale's Monasticon in eight heavy folio volumes. His business again proved unsuccessful, he gave up his shop in 1847, and turned his attention to literature. For many years he contributed to the Family Herald, and also acted as assistant editor on the Reader.

== Final work ==
In 1857 he prepared for David Nutt a 704-page catalogue of theological books in foreign languages, enriched by many original notes. For several years before his death he was employed by his friend Nicholas Trübner, of Ludgate Hill. Here he compiled several catalogues of Brazilian, Mexican, Spanish, Portuguese, Latin, German, and French books.
