= Isa Blagden =

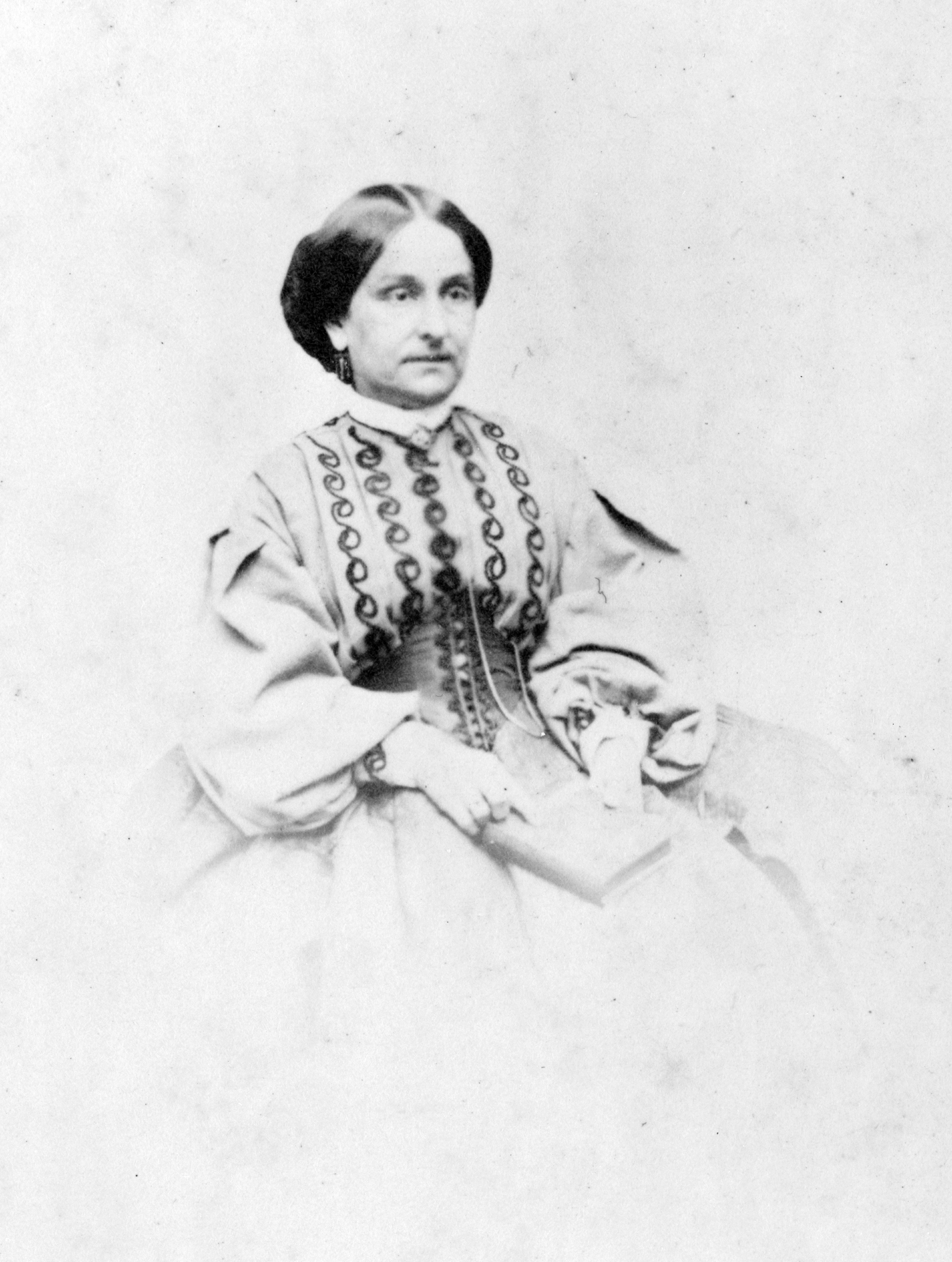
Isa Blagden

Isa or Isabella Jane Blagden (30 June 1816 or 1817 – 20 January 1873) was an English-language novelist, speaker, and poet born in the East Indies or India, who spent much of her life among the English community in Florence. She was notably friendly with the Browning, Bulwer-Lytton and Trollope families.

== Life ==
Blagden's father's first name is given as Thomas in the records of the Florentine Protestant cemetery and her nationality as Swiss, but she was widely thought to be the illegitimate offspring of an English father and an Indian mother. This seemed to be confirmed by an Oriental appearance. There is circumstantial evidence that she was born in Calcutta, the natural daughter of one Thomas Bracken and of a Eurasian, possibly named Blagden. Little is known firmly about her before she arrived in 1850 in Florence, where she soon became a feature of the English community. She was probably educated at Louisa Agassiz's Ladies School near Regent's Park, London, which was favoured by English parents in India.

In Florence Blagden had a comfortable income (possibly an allowance from her father and later his estate) and was remembered as a kind, generous friend, notably to the Browning, Bulwer-Lytton and Trollope families. She is said to have occupied "a unique place in the Brownings' circle by virtue of her intimacy with both poets." She may have been romantically involved with Robert Bulwer-Lytton, the poet son of the novelist Edward Bulwer-Lytton and his wife Rosina, after nursing him in 1857.

== Writings ==
Blagden's earliest pieces were two poems inspired by the work of Edward Bulwer-Lytton, which appeared in The Metropolitan Magazine in July 1842 and April 1843. Another, entitled "To George Sand on her Interview with Elizabeth Barrett Browning", commemorated a meeting between the two writers in 1852.

It was Elizabeth Barrett Browning who encouraged her to write novels. Agnes Tremorne appeared in 1861. Her four subsequent novels were The Cost of a Secret (1863), The Woman I Loved and the Woman Who Loved Me (serial 1862, book 1865) (narrated by a male), Nora and Archibald Lee (1867), and The Crown of a Life (1869). These have been described as "quirky and sometimes laboured." The first concerns a woman artist in the period of struggle for Italian independence. Her writing often concerned women's occupations and independence, female artistic genius, mesmerism and spiritualism, and moral rather than physical beauty.

Blagden's manuscript poems were collected posthumously by Linda Mazini and published in 1873, with a memoir by Alfred Austin – to the annoyance of Robert Browning, who disliked him. A volume of Robert Browning's letters to Blagden entitled Dearest Isa appeared in 1990. All her poetry appeared anonymously except a contribution to the volume The Victoria Regia.

Presumably for financial reasons, Blagden took up writing for periodicals, beginning with a biographical essay on the sculptor Felicie de Fauveau in the October 1858 number of the English Woman's Journal. This was praised by the Brownings. Her identified prose contributions appeared mainly in the Cornhill Magazine and Fraser's Magazine.

== Affection ==
Some of the surviving letters to Blagden from Elizabeth Barrett Browning and Robert Browning are demonstrably affectionate. (Unfortunately Blagden's letters to them have not survived.)

"Isa, perfect in companionship, as in other things," Elizabeth Barrett Browning wrote of her. In one letter to Isa in the summer of 1859, she wrote: "My ever dearest, kindest Isa, I can't let another day go without writing just a word to say that I am alive enough to love you." In another from Paris a year earlier, Elizabeth Barrett Browning states that they had arrived "having lost nothing – neither a carpet-bag nor a bit of our true love for you."

== External resources ==
- A longer consideration of Blagden's life in Florence, her relations with the Browning family, and her possible blood relationships: "Isa Blagden", in: The Brownings' Correspondence (Winfield, Kansas: Wedgestone Press, 1984 ff.), pp. 273–84. Retrieved 13 May 2015.
- There is a half-length portrait photograph of Isa Blagden, seated, facing slightly right, holding a book, available from the Library of Congress, but only a thumbnail is shown on the Internet. http://loc.gov/pictures/resource/cph.3c25052/ https://www.loc.gov/pictures/item/00649518/
- A photograph and a poem: Armstrong Browning Library & Museum. Retrieved 14 May 2015.
- "Blagden, Isa, 1816-1873". The Online Books Page.
