= Alexander Pollock Watt =

British literary agent (1838–1914)

A.P. Watt
- Born: Alexander Pollock Watt; 28 October 1837; Bridgeton, Lanarkshire, Scotland
- Died: 3 November 1914 (aged 76); St. John's Wood, Middlesex, England
- Spouse: Roberta Strahan (m. 1866; death 1908)
- Children: 6
- Father: James Watt (book seller)
- Relatives: Alexander Strahan (brother-in-law)

Alexander Pollock Watt is generally regarded as the first true literary agent.

Watt was born in Glasgow in 1837. While employed by an Edinburgh bookseller, he married publisher Alexander Strahan's sister Roberta in 1866. In 1871 he moved to London to begin working as a reader for Strahan's publishing business. By 1876 he was a partner in the firm, and by 1878 he was an advertising agent selling space in Strahan's various periodicals. Around 1878 he started working with author George MacDonald, a professional relationship that eventually led to Watt advertising himself as both a literary and advertising agent and creating the firm A. P. Watt & Co in 1881. (Note: The A.P. Watt literary agency was founded circa 1875. A contentious date as it is unclear as to when Watt embarked on transitioning from being an advertising to a literary agent; however, the firm celebrated its centenary in 1975.)

Over the following decade, Watt had become the leading literary agent in the UK, in the process creating business practices that became the standard for the commercial literary industry.

== Early years ==
Alexander Pollock Watt was born on 28 October 1837 to James and Elizabeth (Pollock) Watt, in the Bridgeton district of Glasgow, Scotland. He was the oldest of five children. (Note: Alexander's youngest brother James Wallace Watt was born after the 1851 Scotland census, shortly before the family's move to Cumbria.)By the 1851 census, his family lived in Edinburgh, where his father was a bookbinder and bookseller.Alexander was self-educated through “incessant” reading. He remained in Edinburgh when the rest of the family moved to Carlisle, in Cumbria, England in 1853. In the 1861 Scotland census, he listed employment as a woolen drapers assistant in a fabric shop, and a lodger with another family.

In 1866, Alexander married Roberta Stahan, the sister of Alexander Strahan, a London-based publisher, in Edinburgh. Their first son James was born the following year in Glasgow. Second son Alexander Strahan was born in Lewisham in 1869, highlighting the A. P. Watt family's relocation to London.

== Career ==
By 1871 Watt began working as a reader for his brother-in-law's publishing business, in 1876 became a partner in the second incarnation of Strahan & Co, and by 1878 an advertising agent selling space in the firm's periodicals. That same year, he developed a professional relationship with the author George MacDonald that began Watt's work as a literary agent.

== Legacy ==
By 1909, Watt's position within the publishing industry was reflected in the list of clients he and his firm had represented since MacDonald 30 years previously, including Arthur Conan Doyle, Thomas Hardy, Rudyard Kipling, H. G. Wells, J. M. Barrie, Wilkie Collins, H. Rider Haggard, Bret Harte, Marie Corelli, Mary Elizabeth Braddon, and Jerome K. Jerome.

His clients' works were licensed to the major British and American publishers and editors of the day, including A & C Black, Chatto & Windus, Houghton Mifflin, Longmans, Methuen, Smith, Elder & Co., George Newnes, J. A. Spender, the Daily Chronicle, and The Illustrated London News.

The agency became A. P. Watt & Son in 1892, and celebrated its centenary in 1975. After the end of family control, it become AP Watt, Ltd in 1982, and was bought by United Agents in 2012.

== Death ==
Watt died at his home at 29 Abbey Road, St. John's Wood, Middlesex, London, England on 3 November 1914.

=== Estate ===
According to the probate register the effects of Watt's estate were £59,828 (equivalent to about £5,318,000 in 2025) (Note: To be specific, the estate's listed amount was £59828 12s. 6d. The pre-decimalisation shillings and pence tally out to an additional £0.63.), with his four sons as executors.

== Bibliography ==
- Watt, Alexander Pollock, ed. (1897). Letters addressed to A. P. Watt. London: A. P. Watt & Son.

== Citations ==
- Gillies, Mary Ann (March 1993). "A. P. Watt, literary agent". Publishing Research Quarterly. 9 (1): 20–33. doi:10.1007/BF02680630.
- "To Alexander Pollock Watt, 10 October 1885". 2008.
- "1861 England Census: Household of James Watt". Ancestry.com. Kew, Surrey, England: The National Archives (TNA). "Class: RG 9; Piece: 3920; Folio: 23; Page: 40; GSU roll: 543206. Place: Caldewgate Civil Parish, Holy Trinity Ecclesiastical Parish, Carlisle Registration District, St Mary Sub-registration district, Cumberland, England. Head of household: James Watt. Person of interest: James Wallace Watt (son)."
- "Surname Range: Tabb-Zrinyl, England & Wales, National Probate Calendar (Index of Wills and Administrations), 1858-1995". Calendar of the Grants of Probate and Letters of Administration made in the Probate Registries of the High Court of Justice in London, England. 1915 – via Ancestry.com.
- Thomas Pinney, ed. (2016). Rudyard Kipling’s Letters to His Agents, A. P. Watt & Sons, 1889-1899. Greensboro, NC: ELT Press. p. xiii.
- "1851 Scotland Census: Parish of St Cuthbert's, Midlothian". National Records of Scotland – via Ancestry.com. "Household of James Watt, featuring Alexander P Watt (son); Civil Parish: St Cuthbert's; County: Midlothian; RD 685/2, ED 197, page 12. Record index accessed via Ancestry.com; digital image facsimile viewed via ScotlandsPeople."
- "The JW Story". James Watt & Son, Coffee Roasters.
- "1861 Scotland Census, entry for Alexr P Watt (age 23)". ScotlandsPeople. National Records of Scotland. "Parish: Edinburgh St Cuthberts, Civil Parish: Edinburgh St Cuthberts, County: Midlothian, Registration District: Newington, Registration Number: 685/5, ED: 74, Page: 8, Household Schedule Number: 48, Line: 6, Roll: CSSCT1861_129. Address: 161 Causewayside Eastside. Occupation: Woolen Drapers Assit."
- Mariisa, Joseph (September 2020). "Enter the middleman: Legitimisation of literary agents in the British Victorian publishing industry 1875–1900". Business History. 62 (6): 940–959. doi:10.1080/00076791.2018.1514013. "The A.P. Watt literary agency was founded circa 1875. A contentious date as it is unclear as to when Watt embarked on transitioning from being an advertising to a literary agent; however, the firm celebrated its centenary in 1975"
- "Statutory Registers Marriages (1866), Alexander P. Watt and Bertha F. Strachan". ScotlandsPeople. City of Edinburgh: National Records of Scotland. 10 May 1866. "National_Records_of_Scotland_id 685/1 87, Marriage registration for Alexander P. Watt (bachelor, drapery warehouseman) and Bertha F. Strachan (spinster), District of St. George, page 44, entry number 87. Initially located via Ancestry.com database."
- "Statutory Registers Births (1867), James Watt". ScotlandsPeople. Burgh of Glasgow: National Records of Scotland. 12 March 1867. "Birth registration for James Watt, born at 8 Granville Place, Glasgow; parents: Alexander Pollock Watt (soft goods warehouseman) and Bertha Ferrier Watt (née Strachan). District of Milton, page 144, entry number 432. National_Records_of_Scotland_id 644/7 432. Initially located via Ancestry.com database."
- "England & Wales, Civil Registration Birth Index, 1837-1915". FreeBMD. ONS. December 1869.
- "A. P. Watt, literary agent". Publishing Research Quarterly. 9 (1): 20–33. March 1993. doi:10.1007/BF02680630.
- "A P Watt acquired by UA". The Bookseller. 30 November 2012.
- "Watt: The Papers of A. P. Watt". Pembroke College Library and Archive, University of Cambridge.
- "Letters addressed to A.P. Watt". The Internet Archive. London: A.P. Watt & Son. 1909. pp. xii–xviii.
