= James Elishama Smith =

British journalist

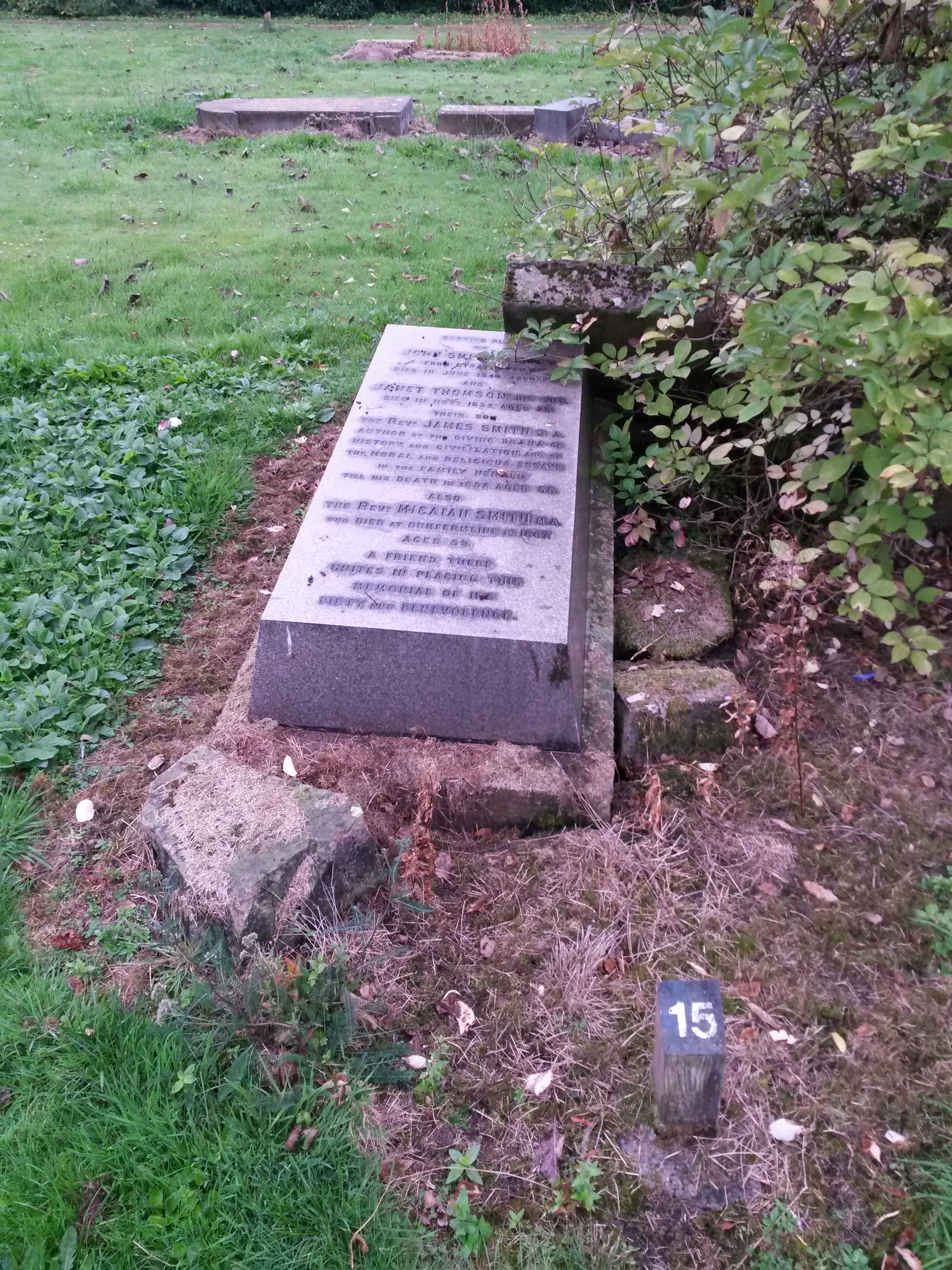
Smith's tomb at the Southern Necropolis in Glasgow

James Elishama Smith, often called Shepherd Smith (1801 in Glasgow – 1857 in Glasgow) was a British journalist and religious writer.

Smith studied at Glasgow University. Hearing Edward Irving preach in 1828, he became a millenarian and associated with followers of Joanna Southcott. For a couple of years he became a Christian Israelite under John Wroe. He moved to London in 1832, and his millenarianism turned socialist. He translated Saint-Simon, edited Robert Owen's journal Crisis, and wrote for James Morrison's Pioneer.

Smith edited The Shepherd 1834–5 and 1837–8, and wrote leaders for the Penny Satirist. In 1843 he founded a penny weekly, the Family Herald, which at one point approached a circulation of half a million.

== Works ==
- The Anti-Christ, or, Christianity Reformed, 1833
- The Divine Drama of History and Civilization, 1854
- The Coming Man, 1873
