= Lisbeth Gooch Séguin =

British author (1841–1890)

Lisbeth Gooch Séguin Strahan (1841–1890) was a British author.

== Life ==
Lisbeth Gooch Séguin was born in London to William Henry Séguin and Mary Wheatley (née Gooch), both professors of music. She wrote a number of travel books about the trips she undertook as a young woman.

In 1878, she married publisher Alexander Strahan and together they had three children: Stuart Séguin Strahan, Geoffrey Bennoch Strahan, and Mary Strahan.

Lisbeth died on 7 August 1890 in Richmond-upon-Thames.

== Works ==
=== Fiction ===
- Little Nineteenth-Century Child and Other Stories (1 vol. London: William Mullan & Son, 1878.)
- Mr. Caroli: An Autobiography (3 vol. London: Sampson Low, 1881.)
- The Algerian Slave: A Novel. (1 vol. London: W. Bartholomew, 1888.)

=== Non-fiction ===
- Walks in Bavaria: An Autumn in the Country of the Passion-Play
- The Black Forest: Its People and Legends (1879)
