= John Keast Lord =

English naturalist and author (1818–1872)

John Keast Lord (1818–1872) was a veterinarian and traveller, known as a naturalist, journalist and author.

== Life ==
He was probably the son of Edward Lord, and was born in Cornwall. He was brought to Tavistock, Devon, with his brother, William Barry Lord, and educated by an uncle named Luscombe. Lord was apprenticed to Messrs. Edgecombe & Stannes, chemists in Tavistock, and then entered the Royal Veterinary College, London, 4 November 1842; and received his diploma 29 May 1844. He established himself as a veterinary surgeon at Tavistock; but he began to drink, and he suddenly disappeared.

Lord is said to have made a whaling voyage and been shipwrecked, and to have been for some years a trapper in Minnesota and the Hudson Bay fur countries. On 19 June 1855, during the Crimean War, he was appointed to the British Army in the East as a veterinary surgeon with local rank, and attached to the artillery of the Turkish forces, with which he served in the Crimea. He received the rank of lieutenant 4 January 1856. In August 1856 he was acting as veterinary surgeon with local rank and senior lieutenant of the Osmanli horse artillery.

When British Columbia was formed into a colony, after the gold discoveries on the Fraser River in western Canada in 1858, Lord was appointed naturalist to the commission which was sent out to run a boundary line along the 49th parallel north of latitude, separating the new colony from United States territory. He was for some time resident on Vancouver Island; the collection (mammals, birds, fishes, insects, and other) made by him went to the British Museum (South Kensington). Two claimed new mammals, Fiber osoyooensis and Lagomys minimus (i.e. American pika), were described by him in the Proceedings of the Zoological Society, 1863. In the same year he delivered lectures in the garb of a trapper on The Canoe, the Rifle, and the Axe, at the Egyptian Hall, Piccadilly, London; and there he became acquainted with Francis Trevelyan Buckland. At Buckland's suggestion he became a contributor to The Field, and joined the staff of Land and Water on its establishment 1 January 1866.

Subsequently Lord was employed by the Viceroy on archæological and scientific researches in Egypt. While there he made observations on snakes and exposed the tricks of the snake-charmers. He brought to London collections of remains from ancient mines and sent them back to Egypt after arranging them.

Lord was appointed the first manager of the Brighton Aquarium, which was opened 10 August 1872; four months later he died, in his fifty-fifth year, at his residence, 17 Dorset Gardens, Brighton, 9 December 1872.

== Works ==
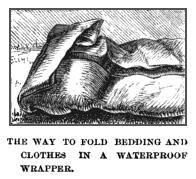
Illustration to At Home in the Wilderness

Lord was author of:

- The Naturalist in Vancouver Island and British Columbia, London, 1866, 2 vols., at the end of which are lists of his collections in north-west America.
- At Home in the Wilderness, by "The Wanderer", London, 1867, 2nd edit. 1876.
- Handbook of Sea-Fishing.

Catalogues of collections of lepidoptera and hymenoptera formed by him in Egypt were published in London in 1871. He helped in an enlarged edition of Francis Galton's Art of Travel, was a contributor to The Leisure Hour and other journals, and under the signature "The Wanderer" contributed papers on sea fisheries and other topics to Land and Water, which for a short time he edited as Buckland's substitute.
