= Octavian Blewitt =

English writer (1810–1884)

- Born: 1810
- Died: 1884 (aged 73–74)
- Citizenship: British
- Occupation: Writer

Octavian (John) Blewitt (1810–1884) was an English writer and long-time secretary of the Royal Literary Fund.

== Biography ==
Octavian Blewitt was the son of John Edwards Blewitt, a merchant, and Caroline, daughter of Peter Symons, sometime mayor of Plymouth. He was born on 3 October 1810 in St. Helen's Place, Bishopsgate, London. Much of his early life was spent at Marazion House, in Cornwall, the residence of his great-uncle, Hannibal Curnow Blewitt; and he received his education at Plymouth Grammar School. Entering the medical profession, he served the usual five years' apprenticeship, partly to his uncle, Mr. Dryden, assistant-surgeon of Devonport dockyard, and partly to Mr. Pollard of Torquay.

In December 1833, he came to London, where he continued his medical studies in the infirmary of St. George's Hanover Square, and spent much of his time in the house of Sir James Clark, acting as tutor in classics to Clark's son and assisting him in preparing for the press his work on Phthisis (Tuberculosis). Afterwards he visited the island of Madeira with a patient, remained at Funchal for eight months, and subsequently travelled much in Italy, Egypt, Greece, Turkey, and other countries.

He was made a Fellow of the Royal Geographical Society in 1839. In March of the same year, he was elected secretary of the Royal Literary Fund (RLF), which office he continued to hold till his death. During his 25-year secretaryship, the institution greatly extended the sphere of its operations. Blewitt spent many years in arranging the archives of the association; and these documents, when classified, were stitched into covers and are now preserved in 130 folio boxes. Alexis Weedon, in the Oxford Dictionary of National Biography of Blewitt, notes his 'staunch Anglicanism' and 'stern moral attitude' to petitioners for RLF funds; and states that Blewitt stood in opposition to proposals for the reform of the society made by Charles Dickens and Charles Wentworth Dilke in the 1852-8 period.

In 1872, Leopold II, King of the Belgians, presided at the annual banquet of the Literary Fund, and testified his sense of the secretary's services by creating him a knight of the order of Leopold.

In 1846, he married, in London, Anne Roper Howard (b. 1811), the widow of Edward Howard and daughter of David Edward Williams. He died in London in November 1884. and was buried at Paddington Cemetery. After his death, Anne published The Rose and The Lily, How They Became the Emblems of England and France. A Fairy Tale in 1876 as Mrs. Octavian Blewitt.

== Works ==
He was the author of:

1. A Panorama of Torquay Torquay, 1830, 12mo, which was so successful that the impression was speedily exhausted, and a second and enlarged edition, A Descriptive and Historical Sketch of the District between the Dart and Teign was published at London in 1833, 8vo.
2. Treatise on the Happiness arising from the Exercise of the Christian Faith.
3. The preface to Glynn's Autograph Portfolio.
4. Handbook for Travellers in Central Italy, including the Papal States, Rome, and the Cities of Etruria, London, 1843, 12mo (anon.); 2nd edition (with the author's name), 1850. This and the following work belong to the series known as Murray's guide-books.
5. Handbook for Travellers in Southern Italy, London, 1863, 12mo.

For twenty-nine years Blewitt edited the newspaper portion of The Gardeners' Chronicle, and he contributed articles to the Quarterly Review, Fraser's Magazine, the St. Paul's Magazine, and other periodicals.
