= Edwin Dunkin =

British astronomer

- Born: 19 August 1821; Truro, Cornwall, England
- Died: 26 November 1898 (aged 77); Kidbrooke, London, England
- Awards: FRS
- Scientific career
- Fields: Astronomy
- Institutions: Royal Greenwich Observatory

Edwin Dunkin FRS, FRAS (19 August 1821 – 26 November 1898) was a British astronomer and the president of the Royal Astronomical Society and the Royal Institution of Cornwall.

== Birth and family ==
He was born 19 August 1821, the son of William Dunkin (1781 – 3 July 1838) and Mary Elizabeth (1797–1873), the daughter of David Wise, a Redruth surgeon. He was the third son of a family of four brothers and a sister.

His father worked as a computer for The Nautical Almanac in Truro, Cornwall. In 1832 the family moved to London, where his father worked for the London office of The Nautical Almanac.

== Education ==
He and his younger brother, Richard (1823–1895) were educated at Wellington House Academy, Hampstead, and at M. Liborel's school in Guînes in the Pas de Calais.

== Career ==
In 1838 his father died and his mother remarried. He returned to London to seek work, and, on the recommendation of Davies Gilbert and Lieutenant Stratford, was employed at the Royal Greenwich Observatory as a computer. George Airy, the astronomer royal, was soon impressed by him, and in 1840 Dunkin was promoted to a post in the new magnetic and meteorological department, becoming a permanent member of the observatory's staff in 1845.

== Personal life ==
He married in 1838 Maria Hadlow of Peckham, a stockbroker's daughter. He always maintained his Cornish connections, naming his villa in Blackheath "Kenwyn", after the village near Truro. Dunkin died at Brook Hospital in Kidbrook on 26 November 1898 after a short illness. He was survived by one son, Edwin Hadlow Wise Dunkin, author of The Monumental Brasses of Cornwall with Descriptive, Genealogical and Heraldic Notes, 1882; and of The Church Bells of Cornwall, 1878.

== Scientific work ==
Dunkin's meticulous accuracy and dependability led to him being given charge of a number of investigations, including the adjustment and error quantification of instruments such as Greenwich's new lunar azimuth and transit circle, and the expedition to Norway in 1851 to observe the total eclipse.

Airy also used Dunkin as a reliable "man on the spot" in various non-Greenwich activities, including pendulum experiments at Harton colliery, and the determinations of the longitudes of the Brussels and Paris observatories. In 1881, on Airy's retirement, Dunkin was promoted to chief assistant, or Deputy Astronomer Royal, holding that post until he retired in 1884.

Dunkin was a highly sociable man. In 1845 he was elected to the Royal Astronomical Society, and in 1884 was elected its president. He was delighted to be elected to the RAS Dining Club in 1868, becoming its president in 1880. He was elected a Fellow of the Royal Society in 1876 and later served on the Council of the Royal Society. He was President of the Royal Institution of Cornwall in 1890 and 1891.

A prolific writer and popular communicator of astronomy, he wrote many articles for The Leisure Hour and other periodicals, in addition to his scientific papers. His most famous work was The Midnight Sky, with detailed charts of the London sky, all of which he had computed himself.

== Publications ==
Publications of Edwin Dunkin, listed in Bib Corn:

- Revision of Hand-Book of Astronomy by Dionysius Lardner. Lond., Walton & Maberley, 2nd edition 1860, 3rd edition 1867
- The Midnight Sky. Familiar Notes on the Stars and Planets, London, The Religious Tract Society, 1869
- "Observations of the Total Eclipse of the Sun of 28 July 1851", at Christiania, Norway; Memoirs of the Royal Astronomical Society, xxi, 9–16 (1852).
- "On the movement of the solar system in space deduced from the proper motions of 1,167 stars" ib., xxxii, 19–73, 1863. [Monthly Notices, xxiii, 166-69].
- "On some peculiar instances of personal equation in zenith-distance observations", ib., xxxiv, 17–24, 1865. [Monthly Notices, xxv, 215-16].
- "Comparison of the probable error of a Transit of a Star, observed with the Transit-circle of the Royal Observatory, by the ' eye and ear ' and chronographic methods". Monthly Notices Royal Astronom. Soc, xx, 86–88 (1860).
- "On the frequent omission of readings of the barometer and thermometer in sextant observations, for the determination of terrestrial latitudes and longitudes", ib., xxiv, 121-22 (1864).
- "On the estimated number of luminous particles contained within a defined space on the Sun's disk", ib., xxiv, 123–24.
- "On the probable error of a meridional transit observation by the ' eye and ear ' and chronographic methods", ib., xxiv, 152–60.
- "Observations of the transit of Mercury on the morning of 5 November 1868". ib., xxix, 12–13 (1868).
- "On personality in observing transits of the limbs of the Moon with the Transit-circle and Altazimuth instruments, at the Royal Observatory", ib., xxix, 259-68 (1869).
- "Determination of the Geographical Positions of Stations in the route from Zanzibar to Gondokoro, from astronomical observations made by Capt. J. H. Speke". Journal of the Royal Geographical Society, xxxiii, 322-46 (1863).
- "Determination of the Geographical Positions of Stations in Eastern Africa, from the astronomical observations made by Mr. J. Petherick". ib., XXXV, 289–300 (1865).
- "Determination of the Geographical Positions of Stations in Western Africa, from astronomical observations made by Mr. P. B. Du Chaillu, during his journey into Ashango Land", ib., xxxvi, 64–76 (1866).
- "On the Total Eclipse of the Sun of 17–18 August 1868". Companion to British Almanac, 1869, pp. 4–22; 1870, pp. 2–26.
- "A Day and Night in the Royal Observatory". Leisure Hour, 1862, pp. 22–26, 39–43, 55–60.
- "The Earth Weighed in the Harton Coal-pit".- ib., pp. 364–67.
- "Memoir of G. B. Airy, Astronomer Royal". ib., pp. 648–51.
- "West of Killarney; a Descriptive Account of the Western District of Co. Kerry, Ireland", ib., 1863, pp. 565–67, 590–92, 603–6, 619–22.
- "The Face of the Moon", ib., 1864, pp. 135–39.
- "Notes on Recent Storms", ib., pp. 181–85.
- "Memoir of Sir J. F. W. Herschel, Bart", ib., 1865, pp. 631–35.
- "On Total Eclipses of the Sun". ib., pp. 666–68, 677–80
- "London Fogs", ib., pp. 694–96.
- "On Far-off Vision", ib., 1866, p. 512.
- "A Star on Fire", ib., pp. 538–39.
- "Coloured Raia and Snow", ib., 1867, pp. 5–8.
- "On the Eclipses visible in Great Britain in 1867". ib., p. 144.
- "Comets and Meteors and Solar Spots", ib., p. 176.
- "On the Severe Frost of January", 1867. ib., pp. 222–23.
- "Comets and Meteors", ib., p. 288
- "On Periodical Meteors", ib., pp. 695–700.
- "Memoir of Sir Wm. Herschel". ib., pp. 727–31.
- "On the Nautical Almanac", ib., 1868, pp. 5–8.
- "The Midnight Sky at London", ib., pp. 23–28, 87–93, 169–72, 231–37, 296–301, 374–80, 439–45, 503–9, 584–89, 647–53, 730–36, 790–96.
- "On Far-off Vision", ib., p. 160.
- "How far off is the Sun?" ib., 1869, pp. 5–7.
- Rose-coloured Solar Protuberances, ib p. 32.
- "The Midnight Sky of the Southern Hemisphere", ib., pp. 103–9, 295–301, 519–25, 726–32.
- "On Aerolites and Bolides". ib., pp. 443–47, 459–60.
- "On the Observatories in the Southern Hemisphere", ib., pp. 794–95.
- "Dolly Pentreath". Notes and Queries., 2 S., i, 17 (1856).
