= Fanny Aikin Kortright =

English governess, anti-suffragist, writer and editor

Frances Kortright
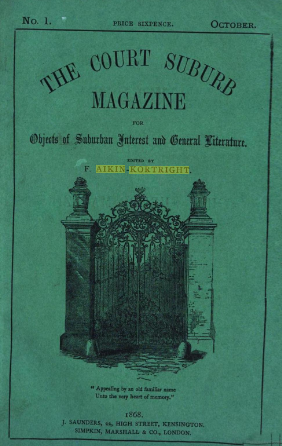
- Issue 1 October 1868
- Born: 28 January 1821; Southwark
- Died: 31 October 1900 (aged 79); Islington
- Occupations: writer and governess
- Writing career
- Pen name: Fanny Aikin Kortright

Frances Isabella Staveley Berkeley Wood Kortright wrote as Fanny Aikin Kortright and Berkeley Aikin (28 January 1821 – 31 October 1900) was an English governess, anti-suffragist, writer and editor.

== Life ==
Kortright was born in 1821 in Southwark. She was the last of seventeen children born to Elizabeth (born Aikin) and Nicholas Berk(e)ley Kortright. Her mother was Irish and her father was born in New York but he had spent his career as a Royal Navy officer. She spent her childhood in Devon, London and St Omer. Her elder sister acted as her governess.

She was well read. Her father died in 1840 and the family had no income. She took jobs with different families as a governess and she supplemented her income by writing articles for the Family Herald which by 1855 had a circulation of 300,000.

Her first novel Anna Sherwood was published in 1857 with the nom de plume of Berkeley Aikin. Her other novels included Old, Old Story Love and Waiting for the Verdict (which was described as an autobiography).

In the 1850s her style was popular but by the 1870s her books were not selling well and she had to give up her house where she had taken in boarders. Between 1868 and 1870 she was working at the editor of the Court Suburb Magazine which was aimed at readers in Kensington. In 1869 she published, The True Rights of Woman. After this she descended into poverty staying at smaller and smaller homes.

== Death ==
Kortright died in Islington in 1900 where she had been taken into the Mercers' Company almshouse at Whittington College four years before.
