= Antonio Carlo Napoleone Gallenga =

Italian author and patriot

Antonio Gallenga
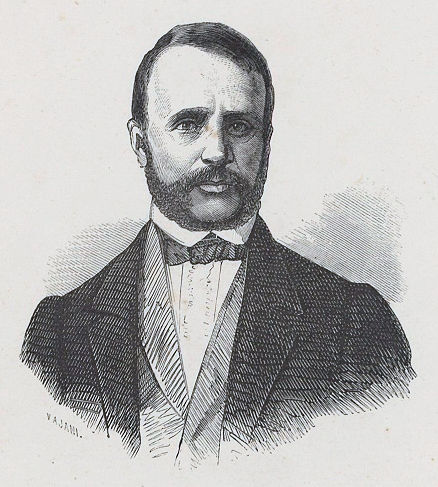
- Gallenga in 1861
- Born: 4 November 1810; Parma
- Died: 17 December 1895 (aged 85); Llandogo
- Education: University of Parma
- Occupation: writer
- Spouses: Juliet Schunck (m. 1847; died 1855) Anna Johnstone (m. 1858)
- Writing career
- Language: English

Antonio Carlo Napoleone Gallenga (1810–1895) was an Italian author and patriot.

== Life ==
He was born at Parma on November 4, 1810. He was the eldest son of a Piedmontese of good family, who served for ten years in the French army under Masséna and Napoleon.

He had finished his education at the University of Parma, when the French Revolution of 1830 caused a ferment in Italy. He sympathized with the movement, and within a few months was successively a conspirator, a state prisoner, a combatant and a fugitive. For the next five years he lived a wandering life in France, Spain and Africa. In August 1836, he embarked for New York, and three years later he proceeded to England, where he supported himself as a translator and teacher of languages.

In 1854, through Cavour's influence, he was elected a deputy to the Italian parliament. He retained his seat until 1864, passing the summer in England and fulfilling his parliamentary duties at Turin in the winter. On the outbreak of the Austro-Sardinian War of 1859, he proceeded to Lombardy as war correspondent of The Times. The campaign was so brief that the fighting was over before he arrived, but his connection with The Times endured for twenty years. He was a forcible and picaresque writer, with a remarkable command of the English language. In 1876, he was the first to describe, along with Edwin Pears, the Turkish atrocities in Bulgaria for the British public. He materially helped to establish that friendly feeling towards Italy which became traditional in England.

In 1859, Gallenga purchased the Falls, at Llandogo on the Wye, as a residence, and to there he retired in 1885. He died at this house on December 17, 1895. He was twice married.

== Collections ==
University College London Special Collections holds letters from Gallenga to Robert Cole written in 1853. The letters discuss a transcription by Ugo Foscolo.

== Works ==
Among his chief works are

- Italy Past and Present (1848);
- Historical Memoir of Frá Dolcino and his Times (1853);
- History of Piedmont (3 vols., 1855;
  - Italian translation, 1856);
- Country Life in Piedmont (1858);
- The Invasion of Denmark (2 vols., 1864);
- The Pearl of the Antilles [travels in Cuba] (1873);
- Italy Revisited (2 vols., 1875);
- Two Years of the Eastern Question (vol. 1 & vol. 2, 1877);
- The Pope [Pius IX] and the King [Victor Emmanuel] (2 vols., 1879);
- South America (1880);
- A Summer Tour in Russia (1882);
- Iberian Reminiscences (2 vols., 1883);
- Episodes of my Second Life (1884);
- Italy, Present and Future (2 vols, 1887).

Gallenga's earlier publications appeared under the pseudonym of Luigi Mariotti.

== Sources ==
Toni Cerutti: Antonio Gallenga. An Italian writer in Victorian England. London [etc.]: Oxford University Press for the Univ. of Hull, 1974.
