= Anne Marie Kortright =

Puerto Rican model

- Born: Anne Marie Kortright Martinez; March 14, 1982 (age 44); Nuremberg, Germany
- Occupation: Fashion model
- Modeling information
- Height: 5 ft 9 in (1.75 m)
- Hair color: Brown
- Eye color: Brown
- Agency: Wilhelmina Models (New York, Los Angeles)

Anne Marie Kortright (born March 14, 1982) is a Puerto Rican fashion model.

== Career ==
Kortright was born in Nuremberg, Germany, where her father was serving in the U.S. Army. Her parents are originally from Puerto Rico. She has been featured in advertisement campaigns for the likes of Bobbi Brown, Levi Strauss & Co., and Swatch. She has also been pictured on the covers of magazines such as Latina and Shape, and appeared in Vogue (Paris) and Maxim. She ranked #50 on Maxim's Hot 100 list for 2003. She has also appeared in DVDs released by Maxim.
