= The Sunday Magazine (magazine) =

1864 London Magazine

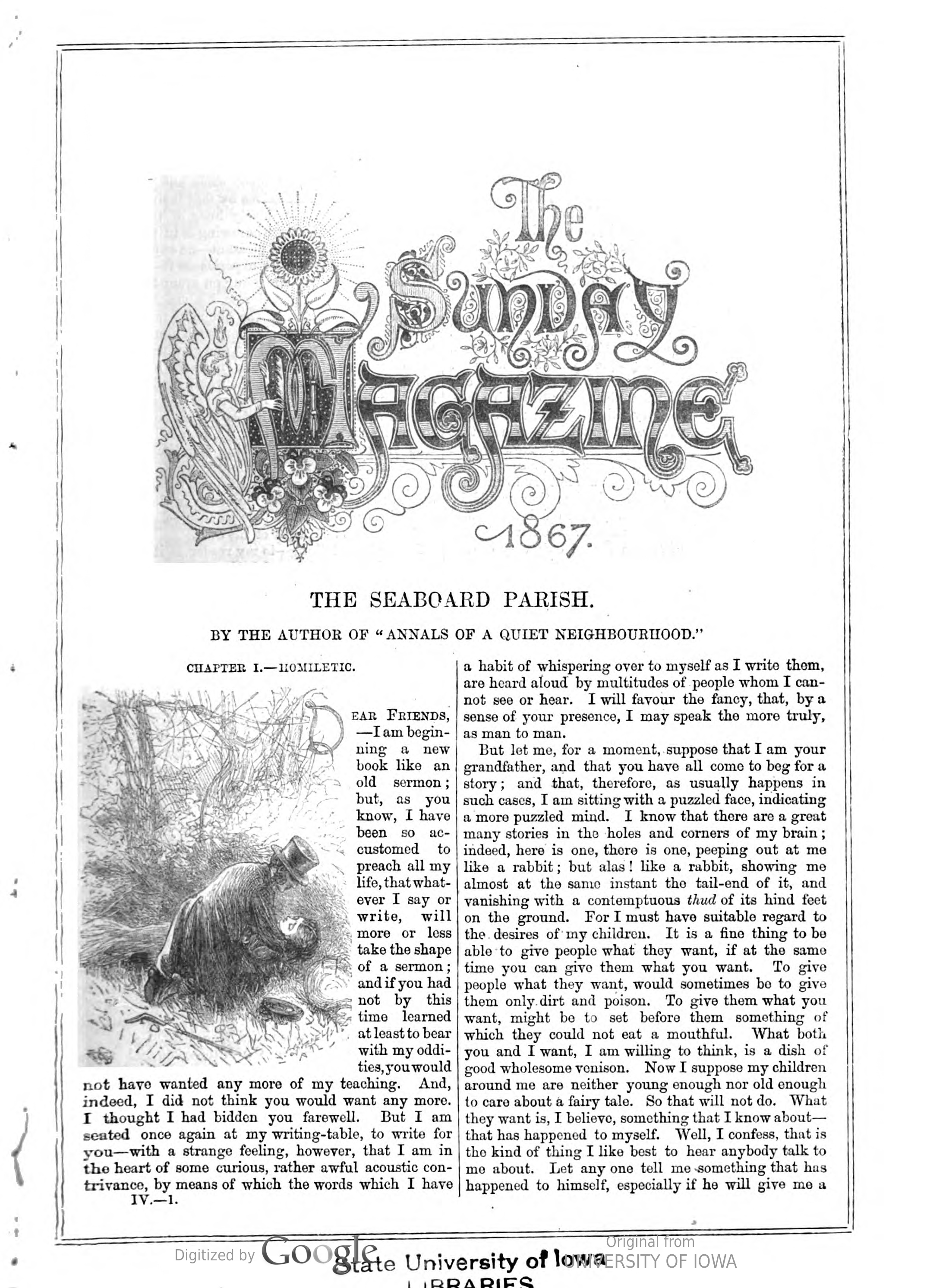
- Example title page from an 1867 annual volume of The Sunday Magazine, featuring the serialized novel The Seaboard Parish by George MacDonald
- Publisher: Alexander Strahan
- First issue: 1864
- Final issue: 1905
- Based in: London
- OCLC: 1779278

The Sunday Magazine (also known as The Sunday Magazine for Family Reading) was a London magazine published by Alexander Strahan from 1864 until 1905. It belonged to the genre of "Sunday reading" periodicals, intended to provide religiously-inspired entertainment for families to read on Sundays. It contained a mixture of non-fiction, verse, short stories, and serialized novels, as well as featuring black and white woodcut illustrations by artists such as Robert Barnes, Edward Hughes, and George Pinwell.

It was initially edited by Scottish minister Thomas Guthrie. Due to declining health, Guthrie had retired from ministry in 1864 in favour of literary efforts, and he contributed a significant amount of writing to the magazine during his tenure as editor.

In May 1906, the magazine was merged with Good Words, another religious periodical published by Strahan, resulting in the title Good Words and Sunday Magazine.
