= Mary Cecil Hay =

English writer

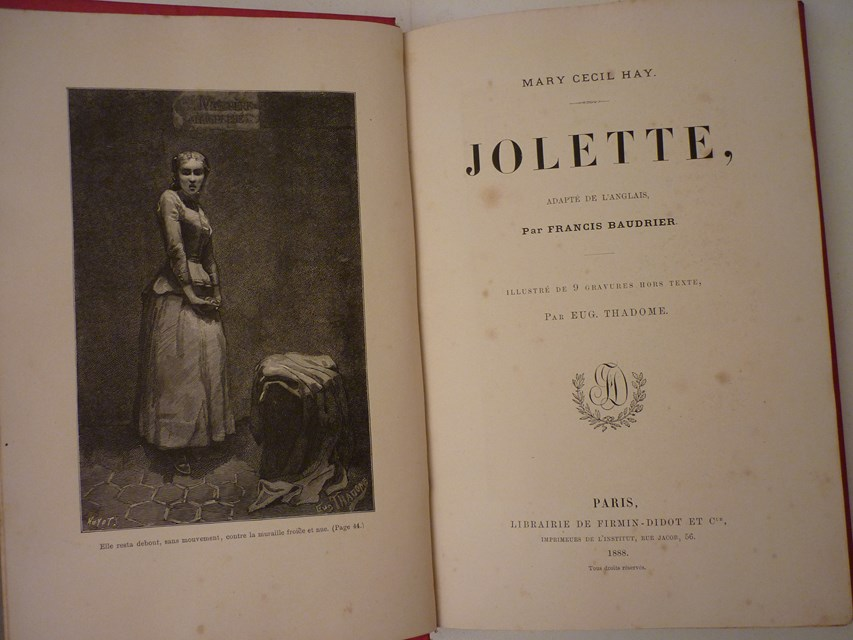
- an 1888 translation
- Born: 10 January 1839; Shrewsbury, Shropshire, England
- Died: 24 July 1886 (aged 47); East Preston, Sussex
- Writing career
- Genre: romantic mystery novels

Mary Cecil Hay (10 January 1839 – 24 July 1886) was an English novelist, short story writer, and poet. Her work was often serialised and appeared in periodicals and weeklies in the UK, America and Australia.

== Background and early influences ==
Mary Hay was born in Shrewsbury to clockmaker Thomas William Hay (1791–1856) and Cecilia Carbin (1798–1888). There were seven children in the family, four boys and three girls, all baptised in a non-conformist independent church. The eldest boy, John (1821-1821) died in infancy. The next oldest son, Arthur Kenneth (1824–1839), committed suicide at the age of fifteen. The middle son, Walter Cecil Hay FRAM (1828–1905), became an organist and music teacher, whilst the youngest son, Thomas William (1836–1873), followed his father into the clock-making business. Mary and her two sisters, Francis Ann (1830–1884) and Susan Elizabeth, an artist (1840–1908) remained unmarried and continued to live at home with their mother. Mary's father died in 1856 aged sixty-five and her mother took control of the business, despite financial difficulties, passing it to her son Thomas in 1872. He became the third generation of clock-makers in the family. After this date Mary, her two sisters and her mother moved to Chiswick and later took a house in West Sussex.

One of Hay's novels, For Her Dear Sake, is part set near the Lizard in Cornwall, a short distance from the Grade and Ruan parishes where she was staying with the family of Rev. Frederick Christian Jackson. Jackson was a competent amateur artist and sold pictures to fund his church, and in 1880 he managed to persuade Madame Modjeska to put on a staging of Romeo and Juliet in the vicarage gardens to raise funds for the church organ.

Although Hay lived at home with her mother and two sisters, she would have come into contact with people involved in the arts and music through her brother, Walter Cecil Hay, and his family. Walter was a concert master, a composer, the Diocesan Inspector of Choirs for the Rural Deanery of Shrewsbury, organist at St Chad's Church, Shrewsbury and a music tutor. One of his best known pupils was composer Edward German. In 1855 Walter married Emily Henshaw (1828-1903), whose father, Thomas Northage Henshaw (1799-1871) was the teacher of Writing and Accidence at Shrewsbury School from 1847 to 1870. Emily was a good amateur artist and painted several studies of the old buildings in Shrewsbury, many of which can be seen on the Darwin Country museum and library web site. Emily and Walter's granddaughter was artist Margaret Dovaston RA. Mary Cecil Hay's knowledge of the arts was reflected in reviews that she wrote for the Royal Academy Exhibition and the Grosvenor Gallery in 1880.

One memory of a particular event in Mary Hay's youth must have stayed with her for many years. In 1857 when she was 17 her brother, Walter, organised a summer fete in Shrewsbury that included music from Monsieur Jullien. The event was in a location referred to as the Isle of Poplars, and access to it was via a temporary pontoon bridge constructed across the River Seven for the event. In the evening, as the visitors started to return home across the bridge, it gave way and ten people, including women and children, were drowned. At the inquest the mayor of Shrewsbury told the jury that he had given Walter Hay permission for the pontoon, only on condition that the construction was placed in the hands of a suitably qualified person. Hay was exonerated by the jury because it was deemed that he had given the contract for the construction of the bridge to such a person. However, the weight of people using the thoroughfare had been underestimated by the contractor and crowd control had been inadequate.

In addition to the suicide of her oldest brother in 1839, Mary's youngest brother, Thomas William, had setbacks in his life and died at the early age of 37 in Boston, America. He had also been declared bankrupt in England in 1867, possibly due to the problems with his mother's clock/watch making business. One of the trustees in these proceedings had the unusual middle name of Bickerton and Mary Hay named one of her villains, Bickerton Slimp, in her novel Old Myddelton's Money.

== Career ==
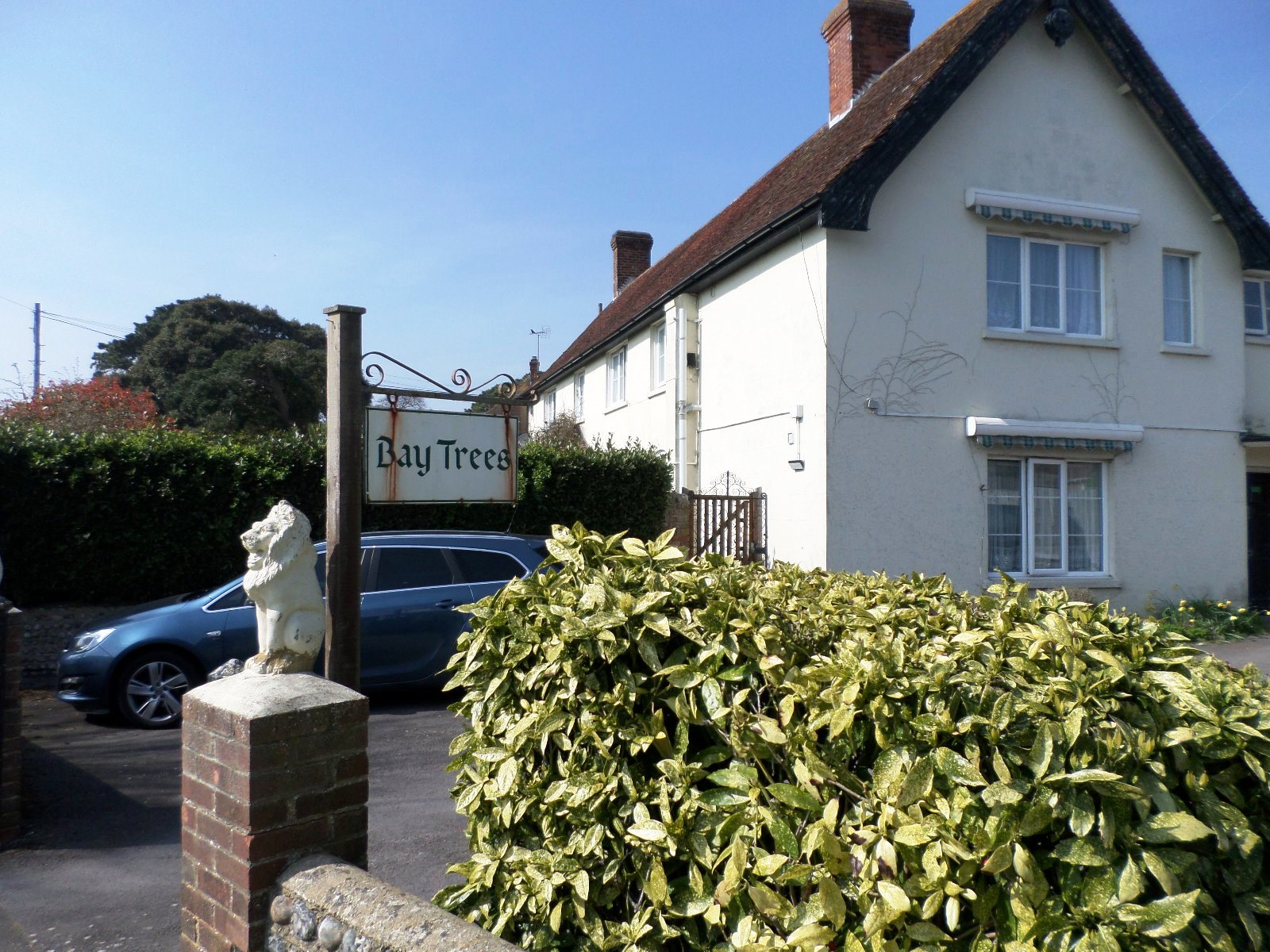
Bay Trees, East Preston

Hay's novels usually had a common structure. They were often set in Cornwall where Hay used to visit, but they also had locations near Birmingham and Liverpool. The story is usually set at an upper class residence and also includes urban locations. The lower class heroine finally gets to marry the higher class and elder hero, but there are usually some legal problem over maybe a will and another secondary character comes to an early and unusual death. Hay was from a Protestant background and her novel's support the role of the upper classes and they frequently have a moral sub-plot. Foreigners and members of the nouveaux riche are thought, at best, to be suspicious and are usually bad characters. The novels are noted for their witty and punny dialogue which have been compared to that of the Welsh writer Rhoda Broughton.

However, it would be unfair to stereotype all of Hay's storytelling in this way. She wrote many works outside of this genre. One example is Under the Will, a novella of about 21,000 words told from the view point of three people. It begins as a romance and develops into an adventure. The story starts with Hope Wynne telling of her childhood and her growing up with two boys, one of whom, Charlie, eventually becomes her betrothed. Charlie and his friend find out about a scheme to work land in Venezuela. They sign up for this and leave England with others, believing they have paid for land that will make their fortune. Hope Wynne is written out of the story at this point. When they eventually arrive at their destination, in a remote region of Venezuela, they discover that it has been a scam, and many die of disease. The two friends eventually make it out of the wilderness, discovering on the way that Charlie has been left a large fortune that must be claimed within one year. The outcome has a twist that involves a deception, and the money being used to mount a rescue mission for those still stranded in Venezuela.

Hay's writings were initially published as serials in magazines like the Family Herald, at first under the pseudonyms of Mark Hardcastle, Markham Howard or Sidney Howard. For a period she used the name M. Cecil Hay, shortening her middle name which was actually Cecilia. Many of her works were published as collections of short stories or as a three volume novel. Novels like The Squires Legacy were published in 60 different issues of the Family Herald in 1875 and this was followed by a three volume novel the same year. The following year the novel was published in one volume, but by another different publisher.

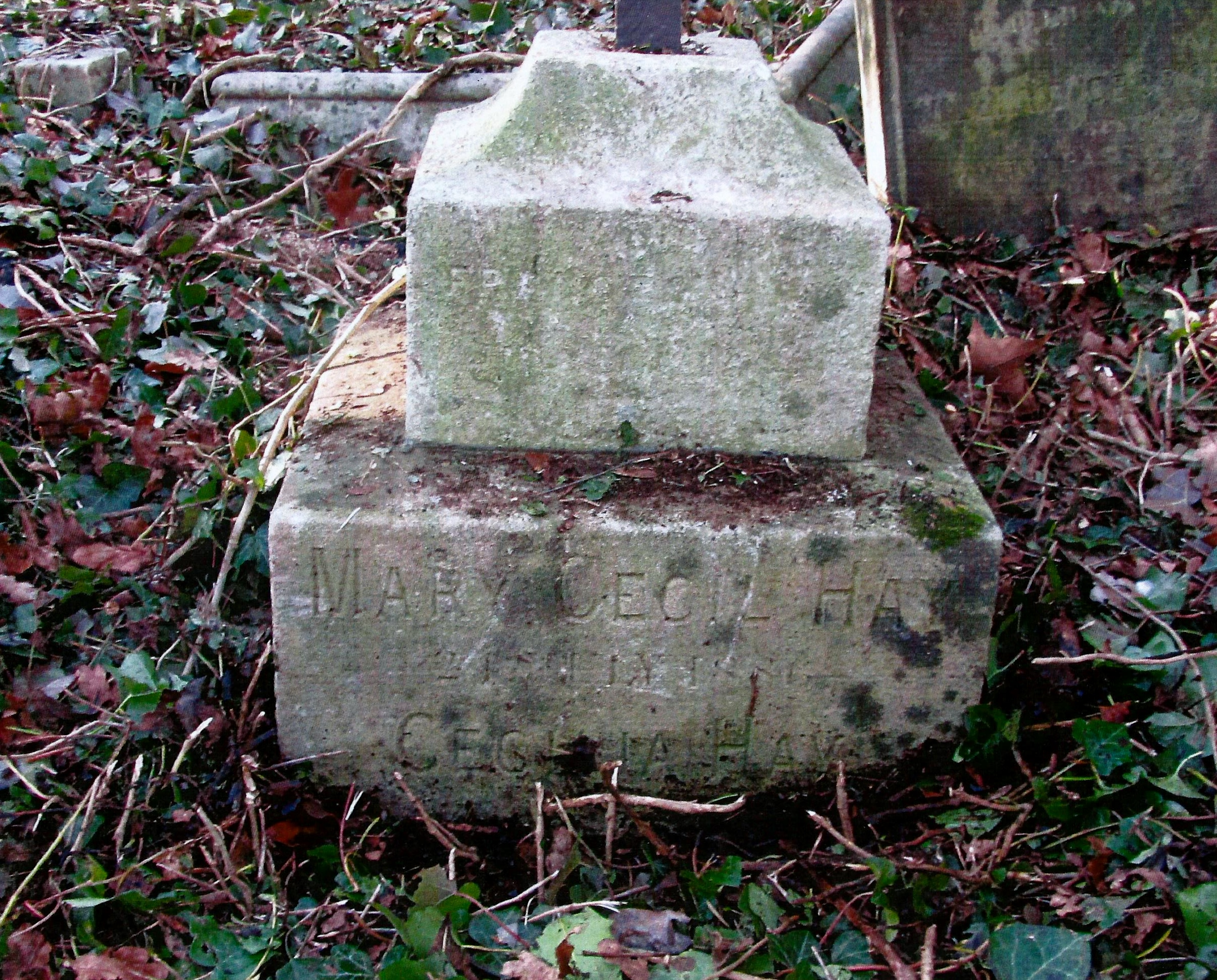
Grave of author Mary Cecil Hay in Highgate Cemetery

Her most popular story was Old Myddelton's Money, which was first published in 1875 and it was still in print in 1914. Old Myddelton of the title was a very wealthy unmarried man, murdered (supposedly) by his nephew Gabriel, who was tried and convicted of the murder, but escaped dressed as a woman. This may seem improbable, but the episode was lifted from the real story of William Maxwell, 5th Earl of Nithsdale, who escaped from the Tower of London the night before his execution in 1716 dressed as a woman. The murdered man's fortune passed to Myddelton's sister, Lady Lawrence, who is childless, and it is supposed that she will leave the money to various of her in-laws. A stranger called Royston Keith arrives in town and takes interest in the affairs of the family, much to the concern of a villainous lawyer who hopes to be one of the beneficiaries. The stranger and another potential beneficiary, Honor Craven, form an attraction, and it goes on from there with all of the loose ends being sorted in the final chapters.

Hay died in a house called Bay Trees, East Preston, West Sussex on 24 July 1886 after a fifteen-year career followed by a long illness. According to probate records her personal estate was worth £272; her sister Susan Elizabeth was named as executor. She was buried on the eastern side of Highgate Cemetery. Her sister, Francis, had died two years previously, in East Preston on 3 July 1884, aged 50. Their mother died in 1888 and the surviving sister, Susan Elizabeth, died in 1908, leaving her estate to be administered by her niece, Amy Isabel Dovaston, mother of painter Margaret Dovaston.

== Works ==
1. Kate's Engagement 1873
2. Hidden Perils 3 vols. 1873 (1 vol. 1875).
3. Old Myddelton's Money 3 vols., 1874 (1 vol. 1875).
4. Victor and Vanquished 3 vols. 1874 (1 vol. 1875), (appeared originally as Rendered a Recompense.)
5. The Squire's Legacy 3 vols. 1875 (1 vol. 1876)
6. Brenda Yorke [previously entitled Known by its Fruit and other Tales, 3 vols. 1875.
7. Nora's Love Test 3 vols. 1876 (1 vol. 1878).
8. The Arundel Motto 1877.
9. Under the Will, and other Tales 3 vols. 1878.
10. For her dear Sake 3 vols. 1880.
11. Missing! and other Tales 3 vols. 1881.
12. Dorothy's Venture 3 vols. 1882.
13. Bid me Discourse, and other Tales 3 vols. 1883.
14. Lester's Secret 3 vols. 1885.
15. A Wicked Girl 1886

Several of Hay's books have been scanned and may be viewed on the Internet Archive and HathiTrust’s digital library. In addition to her novels, Hay wrote poems, novellas and short stories, published both in Britain and abroad, occasionally under different titles. She was a prolific writer, demonstrated by the list of her work detailed below, which is almost certainly not comprehensive. Some works such as The Arrandel Motto were initially published under her pseudonym of Mark Hardcastle. This book was later reprinted and re-titled The Arundel Motto with Mary Cecil Hay named as the author. When she started to use the name M. Cecil Hay for titles such as Victor Vanquished and Kate's Engagement some reviewers mistakenly believed that the author was a man. A widely published obituary of Hay said of her:

Miss Hay, was one of the most active and industrious women of letters. Her pen was never idle and her novels pleased a large circle of readers. She was one of the brightest and most sympathetic of women, with a keen kind eye. One of her little peculiarities was that she did not like to be called Miss. She requested even her friends to address their letters simply to Mary Cecil Hay.

— Literary Jottings, Cornishman - Thursday 23 September 1886

A Dark Inheritance
A Father's Story
A Few Days
A Little Aversion
A Midnight Meeting
A Name Cut in the Gate
A Shadow on the Threshold
A Sisters Story
A Wicked Girl
After the Lessons
All Through Arethusa
Alphonzo's Ghost
Among the Ruins
The Arundel Motto
At Last
At the Seaside
Atholl
Back to the Old Home
Bart Bannatyne’s City Home
Bertha's Christmas Box
Bid Me Discourse
Brenda Yorke
By a Leap
By and By
By The Night Express

CO.
Dolf s Big Brother
Dorothy's Venture
For Her Dear Sake
Guy Newton's Revenge
Hamilton Brothers
He Stoops to Conquer
The Heir of Rosscairne
Hidden Perils
Hope Deferred
How a fairy tale ended
How I Wrote a Novel
In the Christmas Firelight
In the Holidays
Into the Shade, and other stories
Kate's Engagement
Kenneth
Lady Carmichael's Will
Larry’s Hut
Leoline
Lester's Secret
Lettice Vere's Last Christmas-Day

Locked In
London Pride
Lost Harmony
Mid Pleasures
Missing
Mrs Duncan's Eccentricity
My First Offer
My only Novel
Nettie Dunkayne
Nora's Love Test
Notes from a German Band
Old Myddelton's Money
On a Monument
On the Line
One Summer Month
One Terrible Christmas Eve
One Winter Night
Page Ninety-Two
Pennie's Choice
Ploughed by Moments
Reaping the Whirlwind
Ricardo’s Benefit
Sir Rupert's Room
Stop Thief!

The Arrandel Motto
The Blackbird's Nest
The End if a Fairy Tale
The Housekeeper's Story
By The Night Express
The Old Bell Ringer (poem)
The Sorrow of a Secret Story
The Squire's Legacy
Through the Breakers
Through the Wind and Rain
Told in New England
Told in a Picture Gallery
Two Hallow Eves
Under the Will
Under Life's Key
Upon the Waters
Victor and Vanquished
We Four
Well Done!
What our Advertisement Brought
