= Margaret Dovaston =

British painter (1884–1954)

Margaret Isabel Dovaston
- Margaret Dovaston pictured in 1928
- Born: 5 March 1884; Wandsworth, London, England
- Died: 24 December 1954 (aged 70); Lambeth, London, England
- Occupation: Painter

Margaret Isabel Dovaston (5 March 1884 – 24 December 1954) was a British artist who became particularly well known for her oil paintings of historical interior English genre scenes, often depicting groups of figures in eighteenth century dress. She spent her whole working life in the Ealing and Acton area of west London.

== Early life ==
Margaret Isabel Dovaston was born on 5 March 1884 in Wandsworth, London. The eldest child and only daughter of Adolphus Dovaston, an architect, and Amy Isabel Hay. Margaret had three younger brothers, John (who later also became an architect), born in 1886 and twins Geoffrey and Walter, born in 1896. Her grandmother, Emily Hay, and maternal great-grandfather, Thomas Northage Henshaw, were both talented painters. Margaret Dovaston's mother was related to the novelist Mary Cecil Hay.

Margaret was initially educated at the family home at 39 Sunnyside Road, Ealing, London, by a governess. By around 1897 she had started attending Ealing School of Art under the tutelage of Thomas William Cole. By 1911, she and the family had moved to 14 Madeley Road, Ealing, from where Margaret continued her education at the South Kensington School of Art studying under its founder Arthur Stockdale Cope RA. She finished her formal art education by winning a scholarship, enabling her to spend five years attending the Royal Academy Schools (1903-1908).

Whilst at the Royal Academy Schools she won a silver medal in 1904; 2nd Armitage Prize (£10) plus bronze medal, in 1905; 1st Prize (£20) plus silver medal, also in 1905; and silver medal and £25, in 1907. Also in 1907, she won one of the three British Institution Scholarships offered to British art students. Each scholarship was worth £50 per annum, and was tenable for two years. Dovaston was closely associated with the Ealing Art Group, the first meeting of which (then the Ealing Art Guild) was held at her home in 1910.

== Career ==
She exhibited at the Royal Academy in 1908 (The Awakening of Spring) and 1910 (Violet, daughter of Mrs Frederick Hudson). She also exhibited 18 oil paintings and 20 watercolours at Walker's Gallery, London in 1910, as well as 12 paintings at the Royal Society of British Artists (RBA) between 1910 and 1913. In 1910, she had been elected a member of the RBA and had established a studio at Freeland Road, Ealing Common. Also in 1910, she was active in establishing The Ealing Art Guild, later to become the Ealing Arts Club; she organised the first of its annual art exhibitions, and was appointed Secretary of the Guild.

During the second decade of the twentieth century and beyond, she established herself as both a commercial and war artist. As well as book cover design, she contributed illustrations to Deeds that Thrill the Empire and Hutchison's Story of the British Nation. Both these publications were produced in instalments. In 1915 she produced a night-time watercolour of CSM Reid leading reserve troops across the crater-strewn ground of Hill 60 to the front line, with shells exploding all around them. The picture was bought by the Queen's Royal Surrey Regimental Association for permanent display in the regimental museum at Clandon Park, Guildford. The painting was destroyed in a fire on 29 April 2015.

In 1925, she moved to 51 Avenue Gardens, Acton, London where she had a studio, designed by her brother John, built. This address was where she worked, and later resided, until the end of her life. It was here that she developed her style for which she became well known and popular. Typically her oil paintings illustrated elaborate English architectural interiors used as settings for groups of finely-drawn eighteenth, or early nineteenth century figures in detailed Georgian costume. They were created from her imagination as conversation pieces for which it was mainly left to galleries or owners to provide titles. She was able to provide these paintings in considerable numbers. They were immediately acquired by her agent Mitchell of Duke Street, St James's, London, who sold the majority in the US and Canada. In some cases the paintings were copyrighted and prints produced which were used commercially, or sold as popular furnishing accessories. The original oil paintings are still desirable and are regularly sold at the main London auction houses and around the world. BlouinArtinfo indicated that between 1994 and 2008, auction prices for Dovaston paintings had a mean of $22,308 and a maximum of $44,290.

== Personal life ==
Her historical genre paintings were based on an accurate knowledge of costume, furniture and furnishings of the period. This was gained from many hours spent in London museums and art galleries, and her own making of an extensive collection of antique clothing and period household items. Her other hobbies included gardening and breeding budgerigars and other birds. She also had a parrot which was seen in a few of her paintings. During the Second World War she served as an air raid warden at the post in her garden. During the War she painted a picture depicting Willoughby Garner, the Mayor of Ealing, showing King George VI and Queen Elizabeth the bomb damage inflicted locally on Perivale in 1940. In 1956 the Mayor's wife gifted the oil painting to the local council and it is now retained by Ealing Central Library.

Margaret Dovaston never married.

== Death ==
A few months before her death there was a studio sale/exhibition of 12 oil paintings and 7 watercolours at Foyles Art Gallery in London, along with works by Fortunino Matania and Raymond Sheppard. She had been in poor health for nearly a year before she died in St Thomas' Hospital, Lambeth, London on Christmas Eve 1954. Her estate had a probate value of £7,681 12s 8d.

== Gallery ==
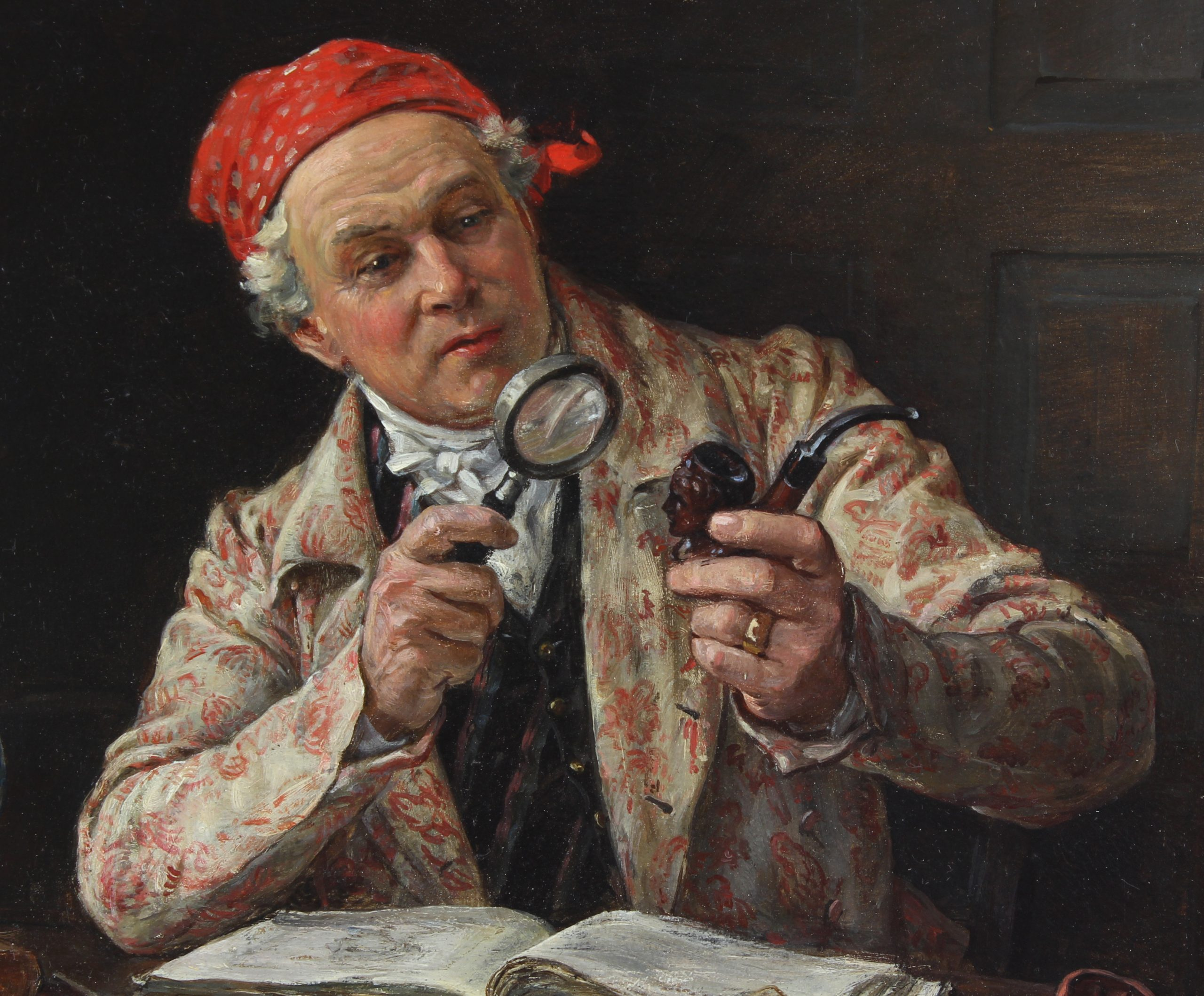
'The pipe enthusiast'. By Margaret Dovaston. Signature lower left and dated 1928.

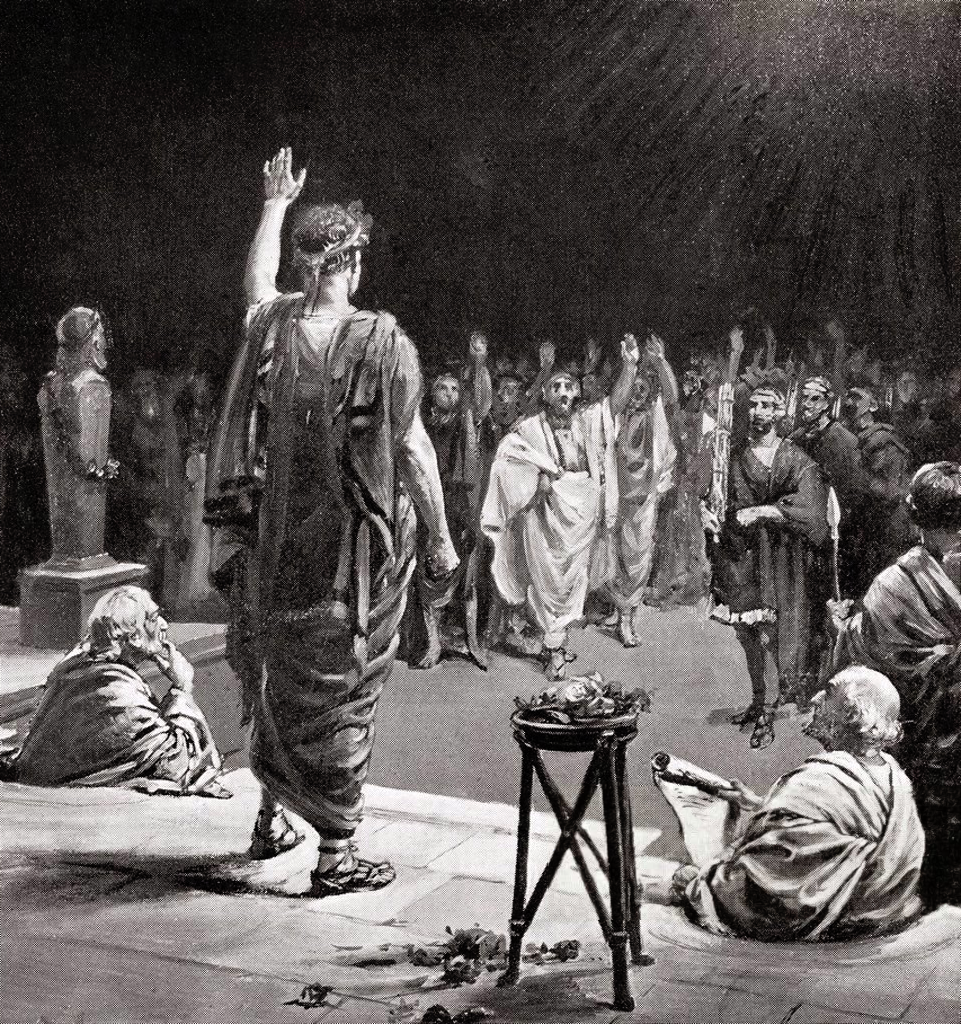
Comitia Curiata.
