= Alexander Strahan =

British 19th century publisher

Alexander Strahan (1833–1918) was a 19th-century publisher. His company, Alexander Strahan & Co., based at Ludgate Hill in London, published what was arguably one of the dominant periodicals in the 1860s, a monthly magazine called Good Words.

== Early life and career ==
Born in Edinburgh, he was a Scottish Presbyterian. He started his publishing business in Edinburgh in 1858. He moved to London in 1862 and "widened his interest to include what his modern day biographer Patricia Sebrebrnik identifies as the literature of Christian social reform." One of his financial backers was Sir Henry Seymour King, through whom Strahan made a lucrative deal with the poet Alfred, Lord Tennyson.

He married Lisbeth Gooch Séguin, a prolific travel writer, children's author, and contributor to periodicals.

Strahan hired Alexander Pollock Watt, husband to his sister Roberta, as a reader for his firm in 1871. Watt would go on to become a pioneering literary agent.

=== List of periodicals ===
- Good Words (established 1860)
- The Sunday Magazine (established 1864)
- Argosy (established 1865)
- The Contemporary Review (established 1866)
- Good Words for the Young (established in 1868 and later retitled Good Things for the Young)
- Saint Paul's Magazine
- The Day of Rest: An Illustrated Journal of Sunday Reading (established 1872)
