= The Leisure Hour =

British family magazine of the Victorian Era

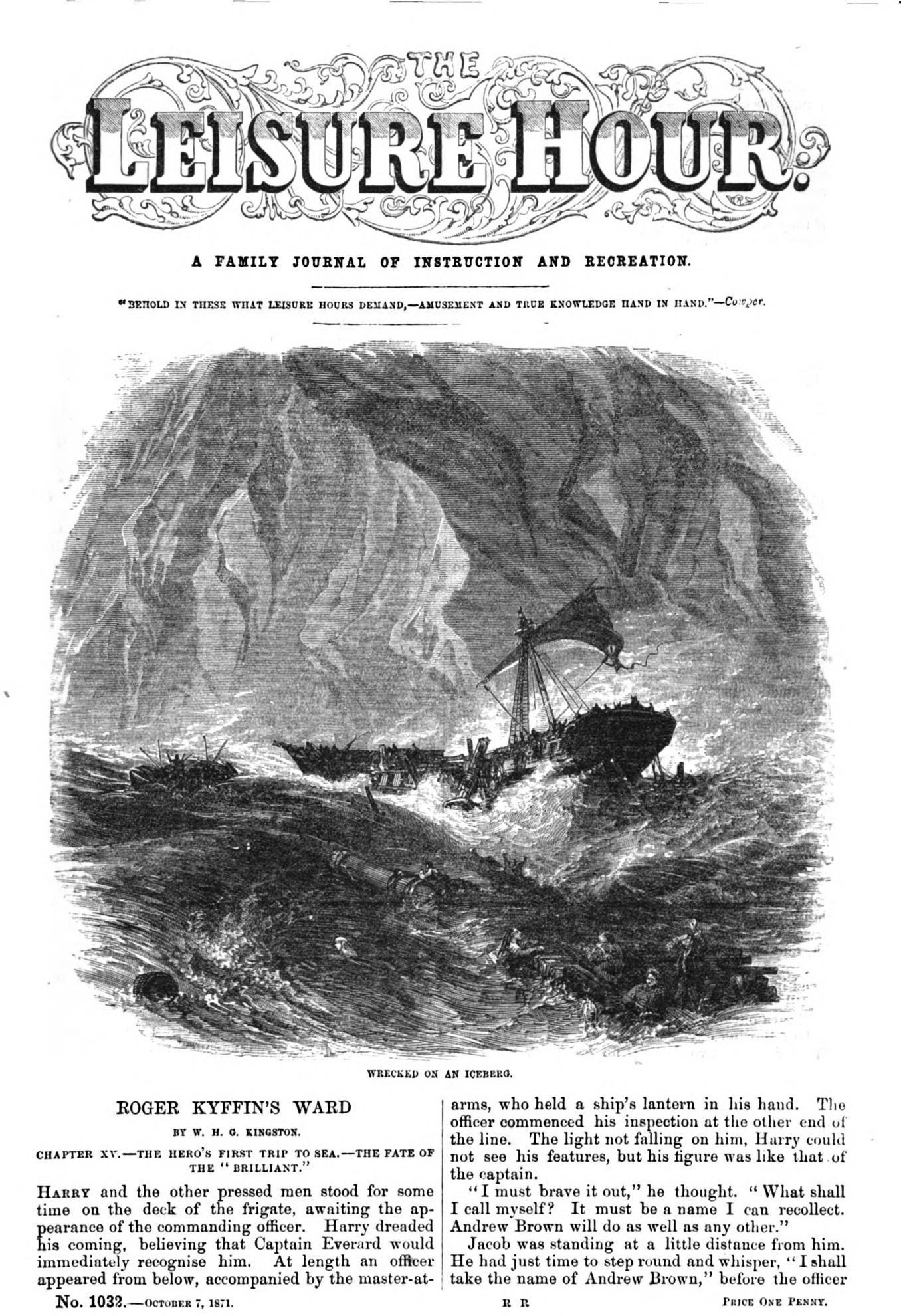
- The cover of issue 1032, with an illustration accompanying a story about a shipwreck.
- Frequency: Weekly
- Publisher: Religious Tract Society
- First issue: January 1, 1852; 174 years ago
- Final issue: 1905; 121 years ago
- Country: United Kingdom
- Based in: London
- Language: English
- OCLC: 362165421

The Leisure Hour was a British general-interest periodical of the Victorian era published weekly from 1852 to 1905. It was the most successful of several popular magazines published by the Religious Tract Society, which produced Christian literature for a wide audience. Each issue mixed multiple genres of fiction and factual stories, historical and topical.

The magazine's title referred to campaigns that had decreased work hours, giving workers extra leisure time. Until 1876, it carried the subtitle A Family Journal of Instruction and Recreation; after that, the subtitle changed to An illustrated magazine for home reading.

Each issue cost one penny and contained 16 pages. The layout typically included approximately six long articles, formatted in two columns per page, and five or six illustrations. The articles were a mix of biographies, poetry, essays, and fiction. Each issue usually started with a piece of serialised fiction.

The creation of the magazine was partly a response to non-religious popular magazines that the Religious Tract Society saw as delivering a "pernicious" morality to the working classes. The ethos of the magazine was guided by Sabbatarianism: the campaign to keep Sunday as a day of rest. It aimed to treat its diverse subjects "in the light of Christian truth". Despite this, The Leisure Hour carried far fewer statements of Christian doctrine than the Society's other publications, and had a greater emphasis on fiction than popular magazines of the time.

Two days before the magazine's launch in 1852, a warehouse fire destroyed the first batch of The Leisure Hour, so replacement copies had to be printed.

The magazine was edited by William Haig Miller until 1858, James Macaulay from 1858 to 1895, and William Stevens from 1895 to 1900. Harold Copping was one of its illustrators. Authors were initially only credited by initials rather than by name, giving the writing a collective rather than individual authority, though naming of authors became more common from the 1870s. In its jubilee issue, published in 1902, the magazine identified 111 authors who had contributed.

== Notable contributors ==
- Isabella Bird
- John William Dawson
- Edwin Dunkin
- John Keast Lord
- Joseph Butterworth Owen
- Jules Verne
- Elizabeth Hely Walshe

== Gallery of illustrations ==
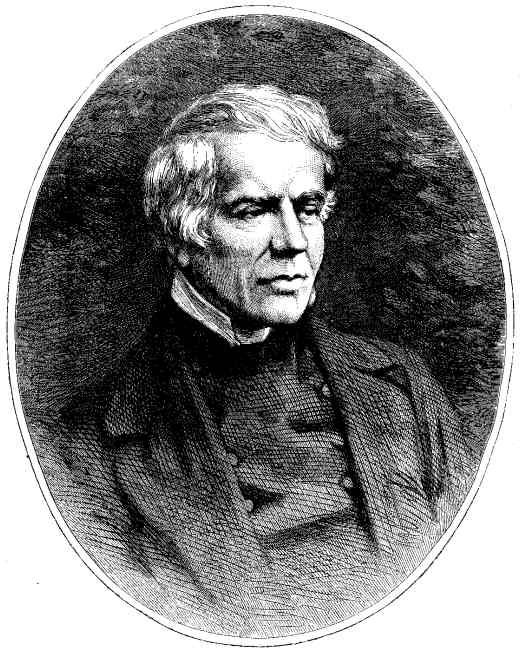
John Keble, 1867

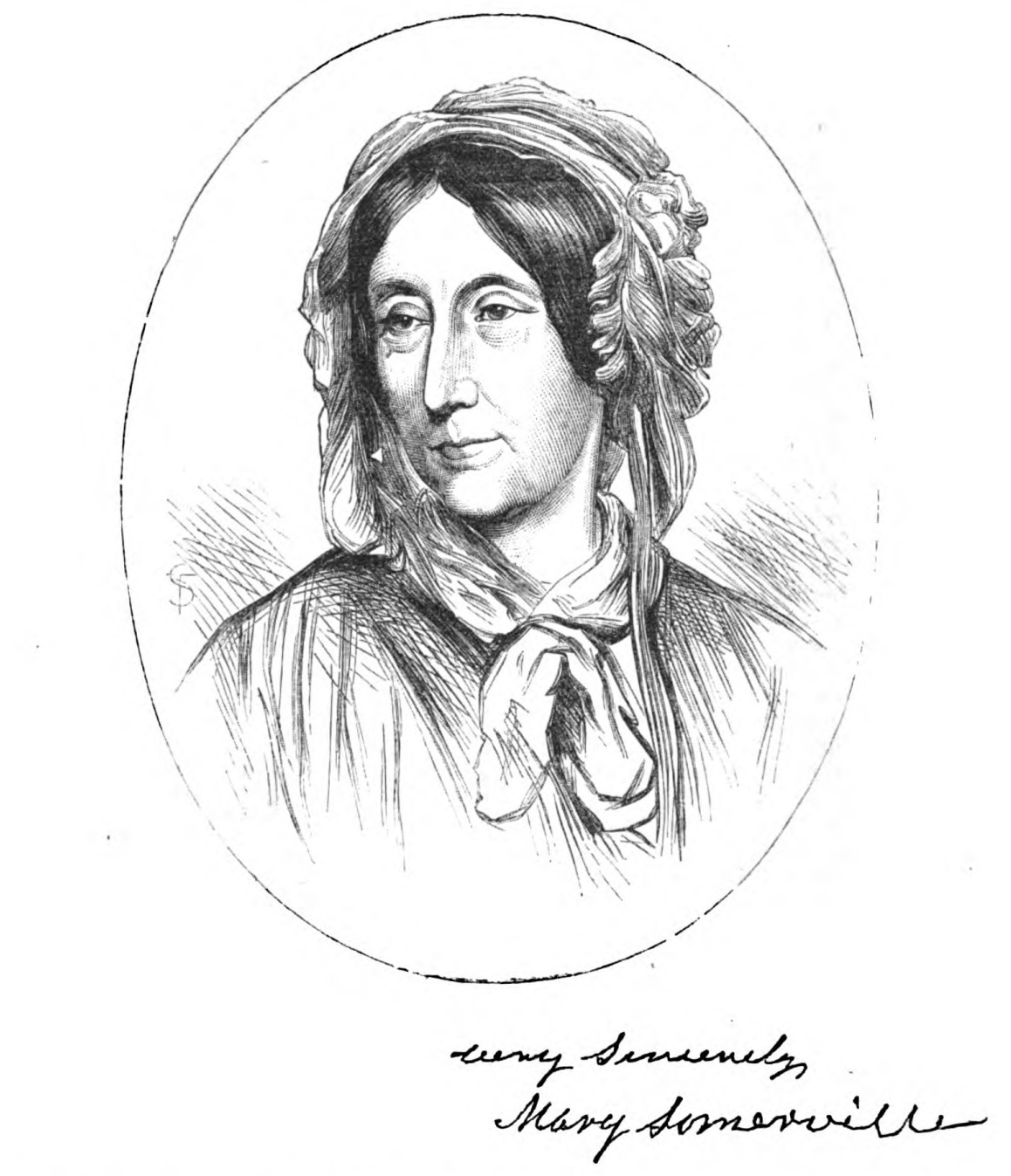
Mary Somerville, 1871

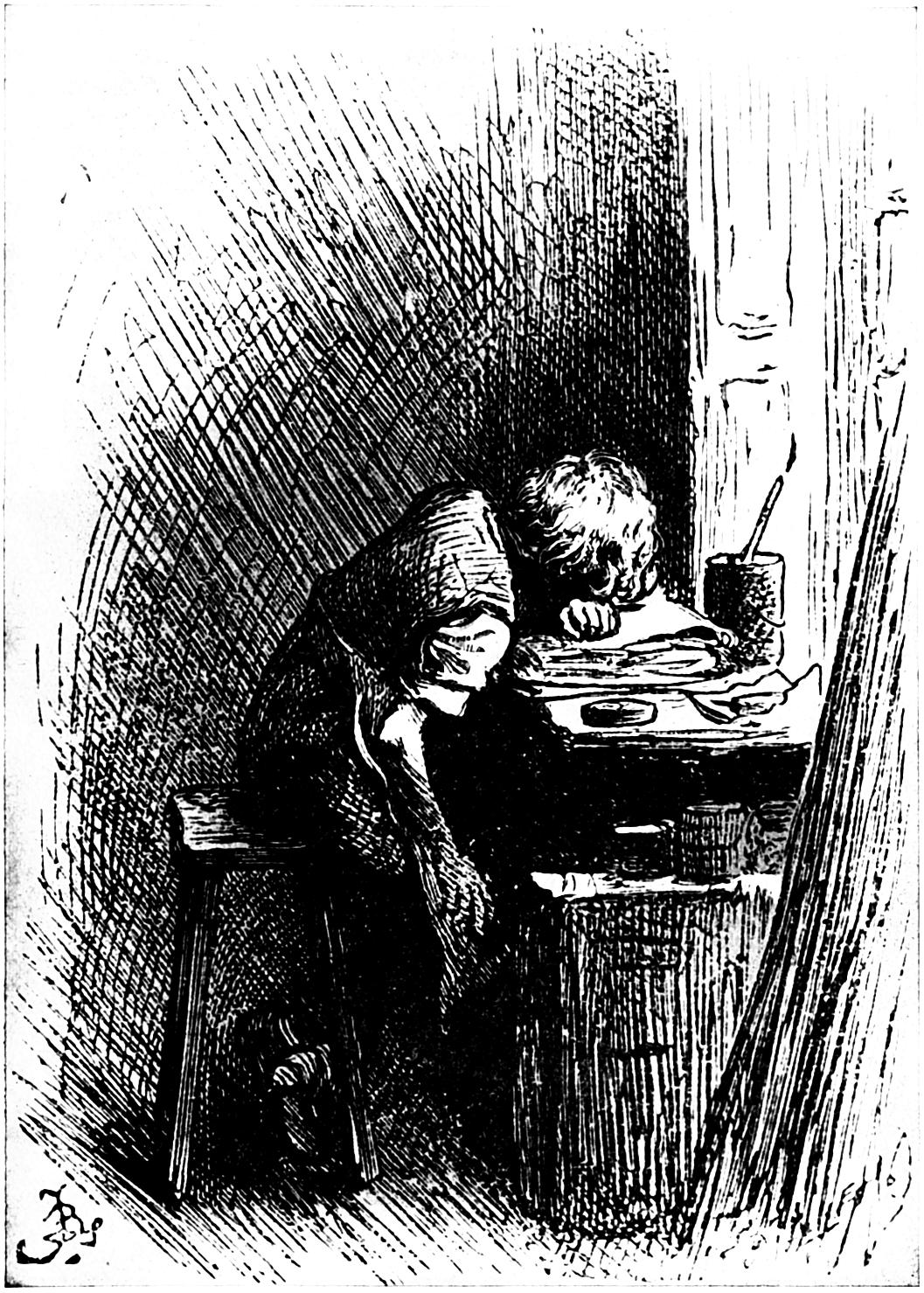
Charles Dickens, 1904

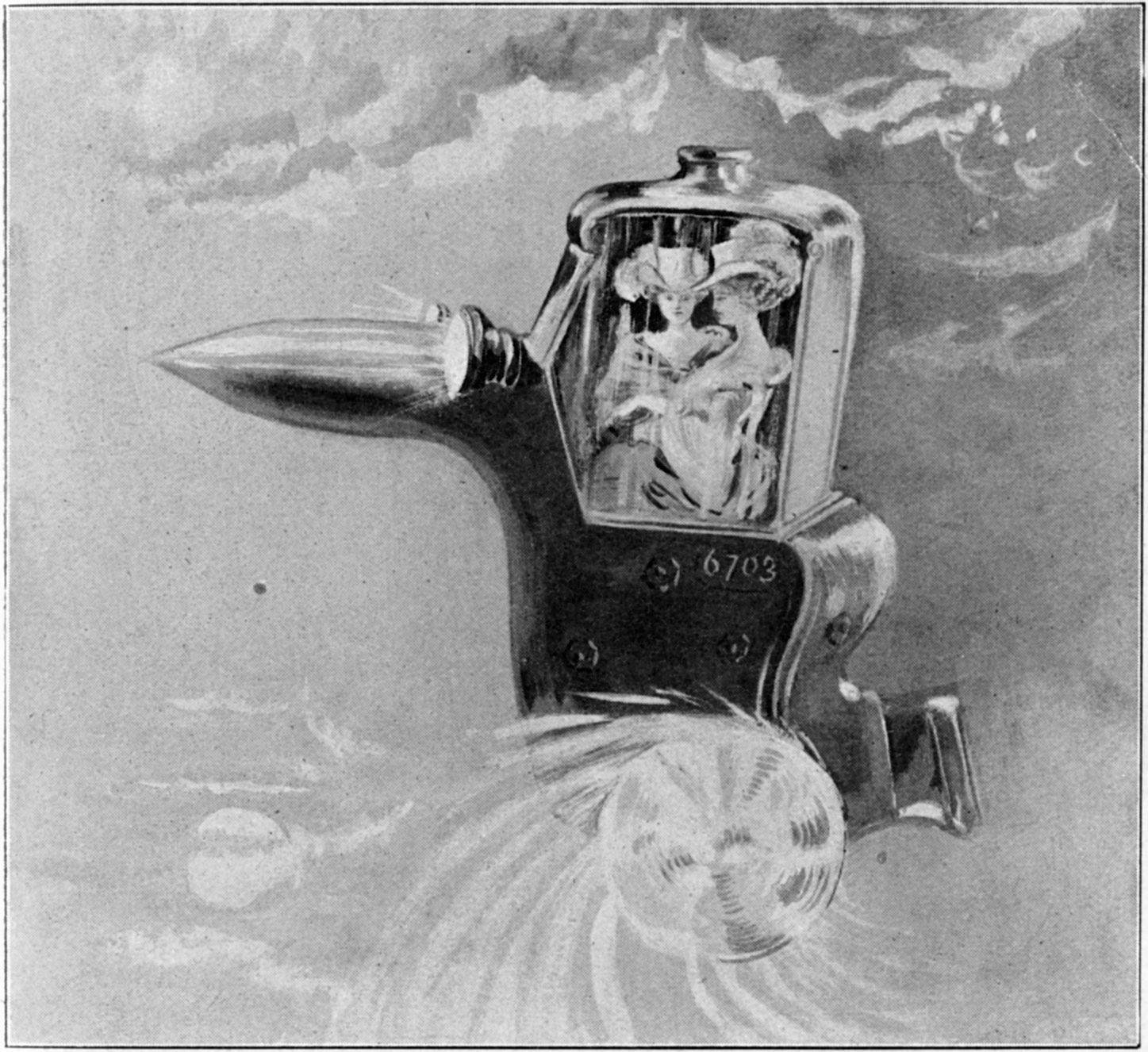
“A Vision of the Future. An aërial motor-car”, 1905
