= Family Herald =

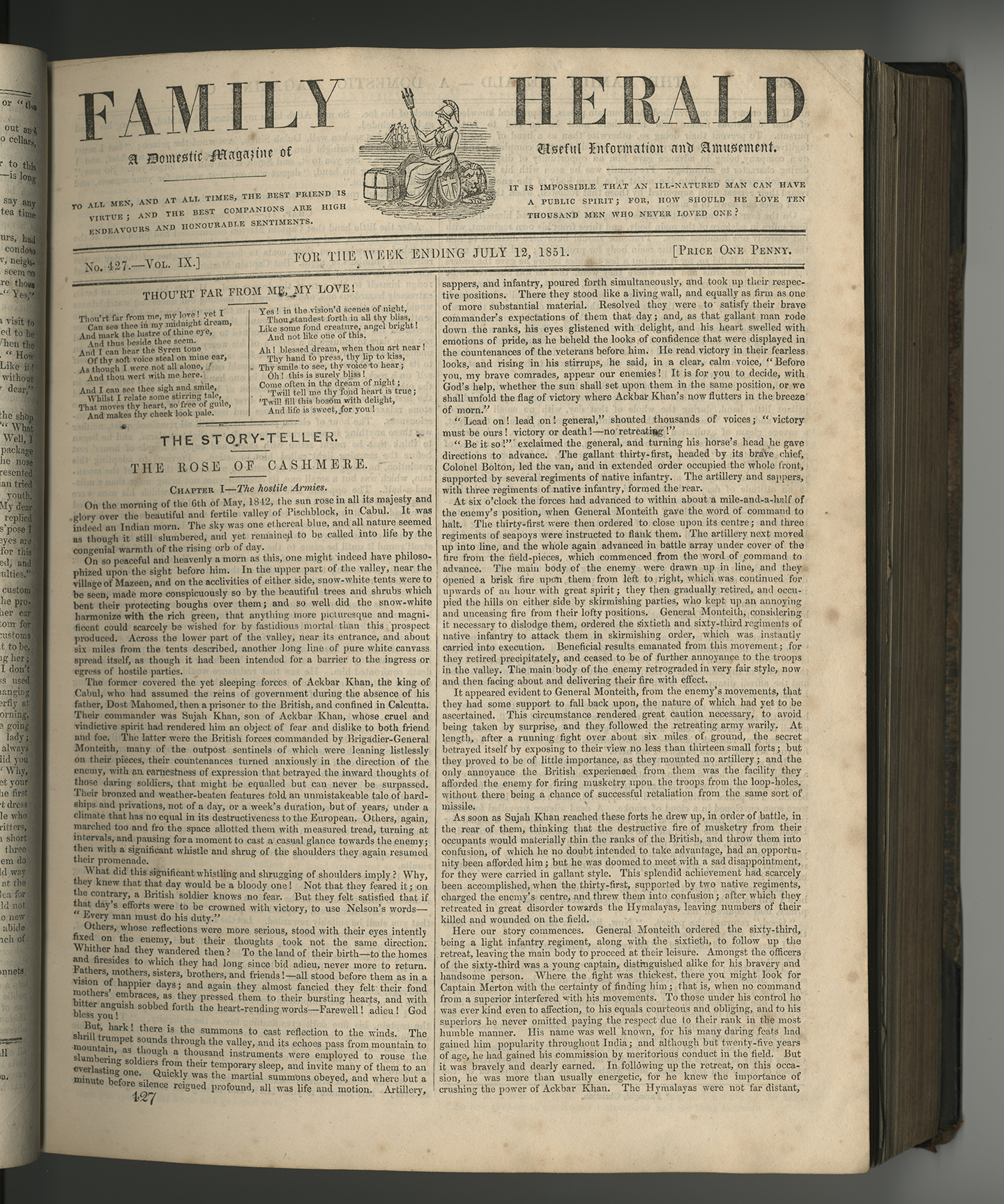
Front page of The Family Herald, No. 427, 12 July 1851

The Family Herald: A Domestic Magazine of Useful Information & Amusement (1843–1940) was a weekly story paper launched by George Biggs in 1842, and re-established in May 1843 with James Elishama Smith and mechanised printing. By 1855 it had a circulation of 300,000.

Initially a penny weekly, the Family Herald later sold at 2d. Contributors included James George Stuart Burges Bohn, Charlotte Mary Brame (1836–84), Bertha Henry Buxton, William Carpenter, James Hain Friswell, Fanny Aikin Kortright (1821–1900), Watts Phillips (1825–74), Frederick William Robinson (1830–1901), Nina Moore Jamieson (1885-1932), Henrietta Stannard (1856–1911), Annie Tinsley (1808–85) and Mary Cecil Hay.

It is mentioned in the Sherlock Holmes story 'The Problem of Thor Bridge' and George Orwell's Down and Out in Paris and London and 1931 essay, "The Spike."
