= Maria Abdy =

English poet (1797–1867)

- Born: Maria Smith; 25 February 1797; London, England
- Died: 19 July 1867 (aged 70); 7 Upper Marine Terrace, Margate, England
- Resting place: St. Peter's Churchyard, Isle of Thanet, England
- Citizenship: Kingdom of Great Britain
- Occupation: Poet
- Spouse: John Channing Abdy (1821-1845)
- Children: Albert Channing
- Relatives: James Smith (brother); Horace Smith (brother)
- Writing career
- Pen name: Mrs Abdy
- Language: English
- Genre: Poetry

Maria Abdy, née Smith, also known as Mrs Abdy, (25 February 1797 – 19 July 1867) was an English poet.

== Life ==
Maria Abdy was born in London. She was an only child. She was the daughter of Richard Smith, a solicitor, and Maria Smith, sister to James and Horace Smith, authors of the book of parodies Rejected Addresses (1812).

Although her mother was from a dissenting family, in 1821 she married John Channing Abdy, a clergyman who succeeded his father as rector of St John's, Southwark. John Channing Abdy and Maria Abdy had at least one boy, Albert Channing Abdy (born 1829), who attended Oxford and became a clergyman. Maria Abdy was widowed in 1845. She died on 19 July 1867 in Margate, and was buried at St Peter's, Kent.

== Poems ==
Abdy's husband appears to have encouraged her to publish poetry. One poem in her first collection was written to celebrate the centenary of his church, and several of her religious poems were intended to be sung as hymns. Yet she also published poetry in periodicals, such as (under the signature M.A.) the New Monthly Magazine and The Metropolitan Magazine, and annuals such as The Keepsake, Forget-Me-Not, Friendship's Offering and the Book of Beauty. Her poems occasionally offered serious social comment, and sometimes addressed social themes with a lighter satirical touch.

== Works ==
- (as Mrs Abdy) Poetry, privately printed, 1834
- Poetry, 2nd series, privately printed, 1838
- Poetry, 3rd series, privately printed, 1842
- Poetry, 4th series, privately printed, 1846
- Poetry, 5th series, privately printed, 1850
- Poetry, 6th series, privately printed, 1854
- Poetry, 7th series, privately printed, 1858
- Poetry, 8th series, privately printed, 1862
