= Peter George Patmore =

English author

Peter George Patmore (baptized 1786; died 1855) was an English author.

== Life ==
The son of Peter Patmore, a dealer in plate and jewellery, he was born in his father's house on Ludgate Hill, London. Patmore refused to go into his father's business, and became a man of letters, the friend of William Hazlitt and Charles Lamb, journalist and writer.

Patmore was Assistant Secretary of the Surrey Institution, where Hazlitt lectured in 1818, after which the two became personal friends. Patmore was thereby enabled to record many details about Hazlitt later drawn upon by the latter's biographers.

In 1821 the journalist John Scott was involved in a duel over a literary quarrel, in which he was fatally shot. Patmore was his second; and was put on trial for murder with the principal Jonathan Henry Christie, agent for John Gibson Lockhart in London, and the second on the other side. Although Patmore was acquitted, he was a pariah in the eyes of some.

Patmore died near Hampstead on 19 December 1855, aged 69.

== Works ==
He was best known at the New Monthly Magazine, of which he was editor from Theodore Hook's death in 1841 until the periodical was acquired by William Harrison Ainsworth in 1853. Patmore was also a contributor to other periodicals: the Liberal Review, the Westminster Review, the Retrospective Review, and to Blackwood's Magazine, the London Magazine and the Monthly Magazine. Several of Lamb's most characteristic letters were addressed to him, as were also the epistles subsequently collected by Hazlitt under the title of the Liber Amoris. Appearing in that book as "C. P.", Patmore was associated with Hazlitt's adultery with Sarah Walker, to the detriment of his reputation.

Patmore's best-known works included:

- Imitations of Celebrated Authors, or Imaginary Rejected Articles, London, 1826; a fourth edition appeared in 1844, with the title slightly modified and humorous preface omitted. The authors imitated were: William Cobbett, Lord Byron, Gilbert White, Horace and James Smith, William Hazlitt, Lord Jeffrey, and Leigh Hunt.
- My Friends and Acquaintance: Being Memorials, Mind-portraits, and Personal Recollections of Deceased Celebrities of the Nineteenth Century, with Selections from Their Unpublished Letters, London, 3 vols. 1854.

These gossipy volumes were filled with personal information on Lamb, Thomas Campbell, Lady Blessington, Robert Plumer Ward, H. and J. Smith, Hazlitt, Laman Blanchard, Richard Brinsley Sheridan and Thomas Sheridan, son of the playwright. The critics, especially in the Athenæum Magazine and North British Review, rebuked the author for their triviality and inconsequence. The fact that the praise so freely given to Robert Plumer Ward was withheld from Campbell raised a storm of comment in a correspondence which ran in the Athenæum.

Patmore's others works (several of which were issued anonymously) included:

- Sir Thomas Laurence's Cabinet of Gems, with Biographical and Descriptive Memorials, 1837;
- Chatsworth, or the Romance of a Week, 1844;
- Marriage in Mayfair, a comedy, 1854.

He also wrote The Mirror of the Months, 1826, and Finden's Gallery of Beauty, or the Court of Queen Victoria, 1844'.

Between the years of 1820 and 1825, he was known mainly for a series of articles in the New Monthly Magazine entitled "Picture Galleries of England", acting as a critical guide to the main aristocratic collections of Old Master paintings at the time. These articles were a response to, and in some ways a dialogue with, a similar series begun by Hazlitt at around the same time, and published in the London Magazine. Patmore's works were serialised and then published in a single volume in 1824. He was forced into publication by the announcement of several other works of the same name attempting to capitalise on his (or possibly Hazlitt's) success.

== Family ==
He married Eliza Robertson (born 1799 in St Pancras, London); they had four children, of whom the poet Coventry Patmore was their eldest.

== Sources ==
- Grayling, A. C., The Quarrel of the Age: The Life and Times of William Hazlitt. London: Weidenfeld & Nicolson, 2000.

== Notes ==
Attribution

This article incorporates text from a publication now in the public domain: "Patmore, Peter George". Dictionary of National Biography. London: Smith, Elder & Co. 1885–1900.
