= Alexandra Thomson =

British composer

Alexandra Thomson Studholme (24 May 1867 – 15 October 1907) was a British composer who published her music under the name Alexandra Thomson (also seen as Thompson). She is best remembered today for her work for chorus and orchestra, Battle of the Baltic.

Thomson's parents were Zoe Skene and the Reverend William Thomson, the Archbishop of York. On 23 June 1897 Thomson married John Studholme (1864-1934) and they had four sons: John, Richard, Derek, and Humphrey.

Thomson studied music with Dr. John Naylor. In October 1890, Her composition Battle of the Baltic for chorus and orchestra, text by Thomas Campbell, was performed at the Hovingham Festival in 1890. She wrote articles about music and composed songs and madrigals, including Fairy Queene (SATB madrigal) and Shepherd's Elegy: Holiday in Arcady.
