= Clarence Club =

Gentlemen's club in London, 1826–1834

Coordinates: 51.50764°N 0.13316°W

The Clarence Club
- Formation: 1826
- Founders: Thomas Campbell (poet); Sir George Duckett, 2nd Baronet; Sir Francis Freeling, 1st Baronet; Sir Gore Ouseley, 1st Baronet; Prince Adam Jerzy Czartoryski of Poland; Prince Cimittilli; William Alexander Mackinnon FRS FRA MP; John O'Connell (MP) JP DL MP; Thomas Henderson (astronomer) FRSE FRS FRAS; Dr Dionysius Lardner FRS FRSE; Henry William Pickersgill RA; John Hardwick MP
- Founded at: Conduit Street, Mayfair
- Dissolved: April 1834
- Type: Gentlemen's club
- Purpose: Promotion of the Arts, Science, Trade, and Finance
- Headquarters: 12 Waterloo Place, Pall Mall, London
- Members: 600 (1832)
- President: Thomas Campbell
- Parent organization: The Conduit Club

The Clarence Club, formerly known as the Literary Union Club, was a gentlemen's club founded in 1826, as a socially exclusive dining society that met in Conduit Street, Mayfair, by the poet Thomas Campbell, with the objective of the facilitation of social connections between those with an interest in the arts, philosophy, finance, trade, business, and science. Most of its members were English, but, originally, it included a significant core of members of Scottish descent. It is notable for its prohibition, then radical, of the extension of membership to any member of the press.

In 1829, it occupied premises in Regent Street, renamed itself the Literary Union Club, and revised its membership statutes to make it less exclusive. It had over 700 members by 1831. After membership became too numerous, it subsequently renamed itself again, as the Clarence Club, occupied 12 Waterloo Place, Pall Mall and limited its membership to 600.

It was dissolved in April 1834. Campbell's Literary Association of the Friends of Poland, founded in 1831, took most of its membership from the Clarence Club.

== The Literary Union Club ==
The Literary Union Club was founded in 1829, by the poet Thomas Campbell, as a conversazione society for the arts, science, and literature. Members convened on a weekly basis, and, at each meeting, a member would present a paper, or make a speech, that would be discussed by the other members. Eminent merchants and businessmen were also accepted, but all journalists and press reporters were prohibited from joining. The founders were members of an exclusive dining club that had met in Conduit Street, Mayfair, since 1826, which had decided to expand by revising its membership statutes to make it less exclusive. The reformed Club, termed the Literary Union Club, is variously reported to have had a maximum of 400 or 500 members, and was planned as, "an attempt to restore that state of society which existed in the latter part of the seventeenth and during the greater portion of the eighteenth century; when all who loved to dabble in ink, sought the coffee-houses frequented by the literary lions of the day, and derived as much amusement from their conversations as they had instructions from their writings."

The first meeting of the new Literary Union Club occurred at Campbell's residence at 10 Seymour Street, Connaught Square, the second at the residence, in Soho Square, of Henry William Pickersgill, R.A., who was admitted as a member. The Club took premises at old Athenaeum House, Regent Street, in 1829, and later moved to 12 Waterloo Place, Pall Mall. Its initial membership consisted of a core of gentlemen who had left the Athenaeum Club, London due to a disagreement with other members of the same: accordingly, the Literary Union Club was described as ‘a sort of Junior Athenaeum’.

It was intended that there would be a branch of new Literary Union Society in each of the major provincial towns and cities of the British Empire and in each capital city of Western Europe each of which would send delegates to the Parent Club in London, thereby creating an international Britannic Literary and Scientific Union, based in London, that would ‘bring [...] England nearer than she is in resemblance to ancient Greece' (Campbell). However, associated societies were established only in Paris and Vienna. Each member of the Glasgow Campbell Club was granted an honorary place in the Literary Union Club.

It was suggested that the members of the club would distinguish themselves with a peculiar evening waistcoat, which would be worn, in public, with evening wear.

By 1831, the club had between 700 and 800 members and become so popular that nine out of every ten proposed candidates were blackballed. In addition to the initial distinguished members, numerous men of little distinction in the arts, science, or literature, had been admitted. As a consequence of this, in 1831, the Literary Union Club renamed itself the Clarence Club, expelled some of its previous members, and limited its membership to 600. The new club was governed by an executive committee of 100, led by the chair, Campbell. However, the new, reduced, maximum number of members was deemed to be excessively large by many of the eminent founders, many of whom, dissatisfied with Campbell's incompetent leadership, left and returned to the Athenaeum Club, London as a consequence of which the Clarence closed, in 1834.

The membership of the Literary Association of the Friends of Poland, also founded, in 1831, by Campbell, was drawn mainly from the Clarence Club.

== Behaviour ==
Known for its 'undue devotion to the juice of the grateful grape', the 1831 Annual Ball of the club was described thus:

On the occasion last annual ball, before the dissolution [prior to its renaming as Clarence Club], to the servants of the club, several members happened, like Tam O'Shanter, to become 'o'er all the ills of life victorious,' by an undue devotion to the juice of the grateful grape. They danced with the maids with an energy which would have done no discredit to the principal performers in a Scotch Highland fling. Tired of the dance, and of 'tasting the lips' of Sally, and Mary, and Janet, and the entire sisterhood, in short, of cooks, housemaids, scullery-maids, &c., they ordered pipes and tobacco, and became so uproarious that no Irish man could have wished a more 'jolly old row.' Among the fruits of the frolic were the smashing of sundry panes of glass, and the demolition of no inconsiderable quantity of crockery, with other goods and chattels belonging to the club. One leading performer in the scene is said to have been a popular poet.

Such behaviour led the members of the Athenaeum Club to satirically describe the Literary Union Club as 'anything but Literary or United' and led the periodical The Age to describe the Literary Union Club as a Club whose meetings were convened on the promise of 'tea and toast' but concluded in 'a bear-garden of a row'.

== Members ==
- Thomas Campbell (poet) (President) (Trustee)
- Prince Cimittilli
- John Wilson Croker
- George Croly
- Allan Cunningham
- Prince Adam Jerzy Czartoryski of Poland (President)
- Benjamin Disraeli
- Sir George Duckett, 2nd Baronet
- Francis Egerton, 1st Earl of Ellesmere KG PC
- Sir Francis Freeling, 1st Baronet, FSA
- John Hardwick
- Thomas Henderson (astronomer) FRSE FRS FRAS
- John Hobhouse, 1st Baron Broughton (then Sir John Hobhouse, 1st Baronet)
- William Holmes MP
- Thomas Hood
- Bogdan Janski
- Dr Dionysius Lardner FRS FRSE
- William Alexander Mackinnon FRS FRA MP
- John Martin
- Sir Samuel Rush Meyrick KH
- Thomas Moore
- John O'Connell JP DL MP
- Sir Gore Ouseley, 1st Baronet GCH
- Robert Owen
- Henry William Pickersgill, R.A.
- Cyrus Redding
- Sir Walter Scott, 1st Baronet
- John Smirnove, Russian Ambassador to Britain (member of the club's executive committee)
- Sir George Staunton, 2nd Baronet
- Richard Watson MP
- John Webster MP
- Charles Molloy Westmacott
- Sir Robert Wilson
