= Battle of the Baltic =

Battle of the Baltic may refer to:

- Battle of Copenhagen (1801), between the United Kingdom and Denmark-Norway during the War of the Second Coalition
- Battle of the Baltic (poem)
- Battle of Copenhagen (1807), between the United Kingdom and Denmark-Norway during the Gunboat War
- British campaign in the Baltic (1918–19) against Soviet Russia as part of the Allied intervention in the Russian Civil War
- Baltic Sea campaigns (1939–45), between the navies of Finland, Nazi Germany, and the Soviet Union during World War II
- Baltic Operation of 1941 by Nazi Germany against the Soviet Union during World War II
- Baltic Offensive of 1944 by the Soviet Union against Nazi Germany during World War II
