= Our Lady and St Peter's Church, East Grinstead =

Our Lady and St Peter's Church
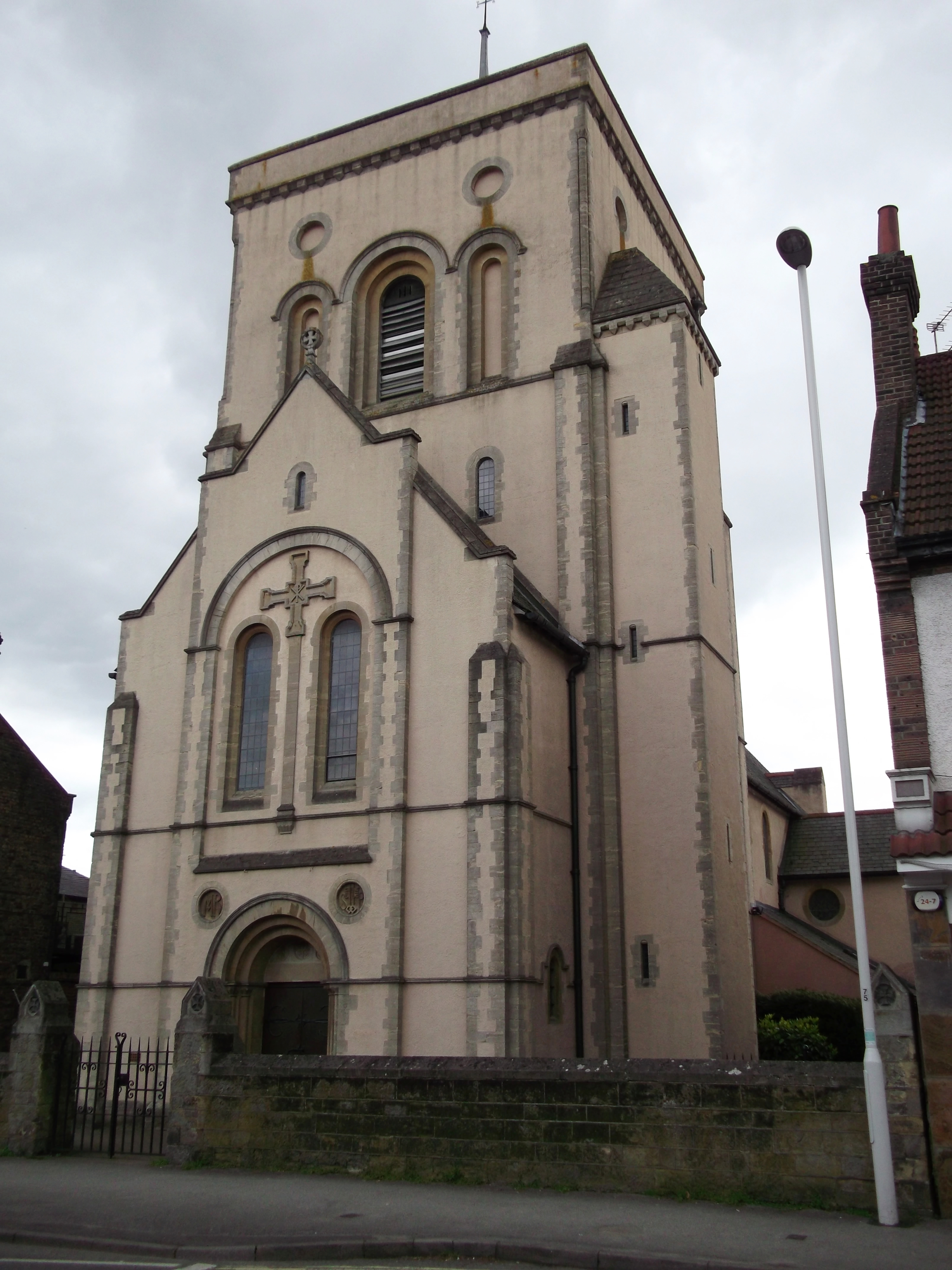
- Our Lady and St Peter's Church
- 51.128658°N 0.014745°W
- OS grid reference: TQ 39001 38455
- Location: East Grinstead, West Sussex
- Country: England
- Denomination: Roman Catholic
- Website: EastGrinsteadCatholicParish.com

History
- Status: Active
- Founded: 1879
- Founder: Sir Edward Blount
- Dedication: Blessed Virgin Mary; Saint Peter

Architecture
- Functional status: Parish church
- Heritage designation: Grade II listed
- Designated: 2 July 2015
- Architect: Frederick Walters
- Style: Romanesque Revival
- Groundbreaking: 15 June 1897
- Completed: 2 October 1898

Administration
- Province: Southwark
- Diocese: Arundel and Brighton
- Deanery: Crawley

Our Lady and St Peter's Church is a Roman Catholic Parish church in East Grinstead. It was built from 1897 to 1898 and designed by Frederick Walters. It is situated on the London Road close to where it becomes Station Road, north of East Grinstead railway station. It is a Romanesque Revival church and a Grade II listed building.

== History ==
=== Foundation ===
In 1879, a Catholic mission was started in East Grinstead. It came from Crawley and was dedicated to St Edward and St Louis. It was founded by Sir Edward and Lady Gertrude Blount. The mission was centred in the chapel of Imberhorne Manor, the home of the Blounts. Sir Edward Blount came from Shropshire and was the son of Edward Blount, a member of the House of Commons for Steyning. After founding the Blount Père et Fils Bank in 1831 (which merged with Société Générale in 1870), and being knighted, he retired to Sussex.

=== Construction ===
On 15 June 1897, the foundation stone was laid. The architect was Frederick Walters. Lady Blount died during construction of the church. On 2 October 1898, the church was opened. In 1899, stained glass windows were installed in the north east chapel. They were made by Hardman & Co., given by the Blounts and dedicated to St Gertrude and St Edward. Most of the fittings in the church was designed by Walters. Also in 1899, the church was consecrated.

== Parish ==
Our Lady and St Peter's Church's parish also includes St Bernard's Church on Vicarage Road in Lingfield, Surrey, built in 1956. Formerly in the parish was Our Lady of the Forest Church in Forest Row. It was built in the 1950s, closed in 2009, and was once visited by US President John F. Kennedy in 1963, during his only official visit to the UK.

Our Lady and St Peter's Church has two Sunday Masses at 6.15pm on Saturday and at 10:30am on Sunday. St Bernard's Church has one Sunday Mass at 9:00am. Our Lady and St Peter's Church has its weekdays Masses at 9:30am.

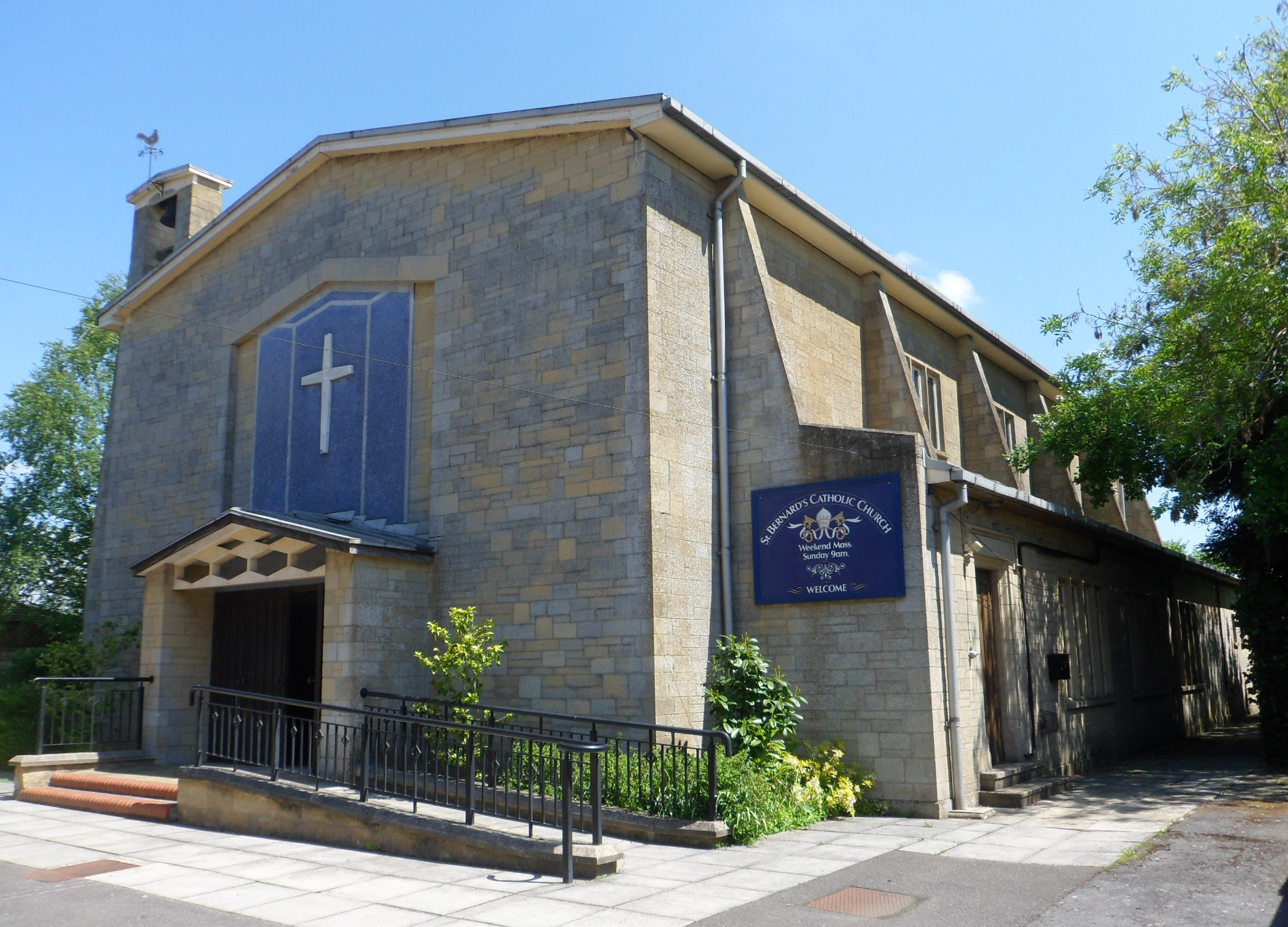
St Bernard's Church in Lingfield, part of the same parish.

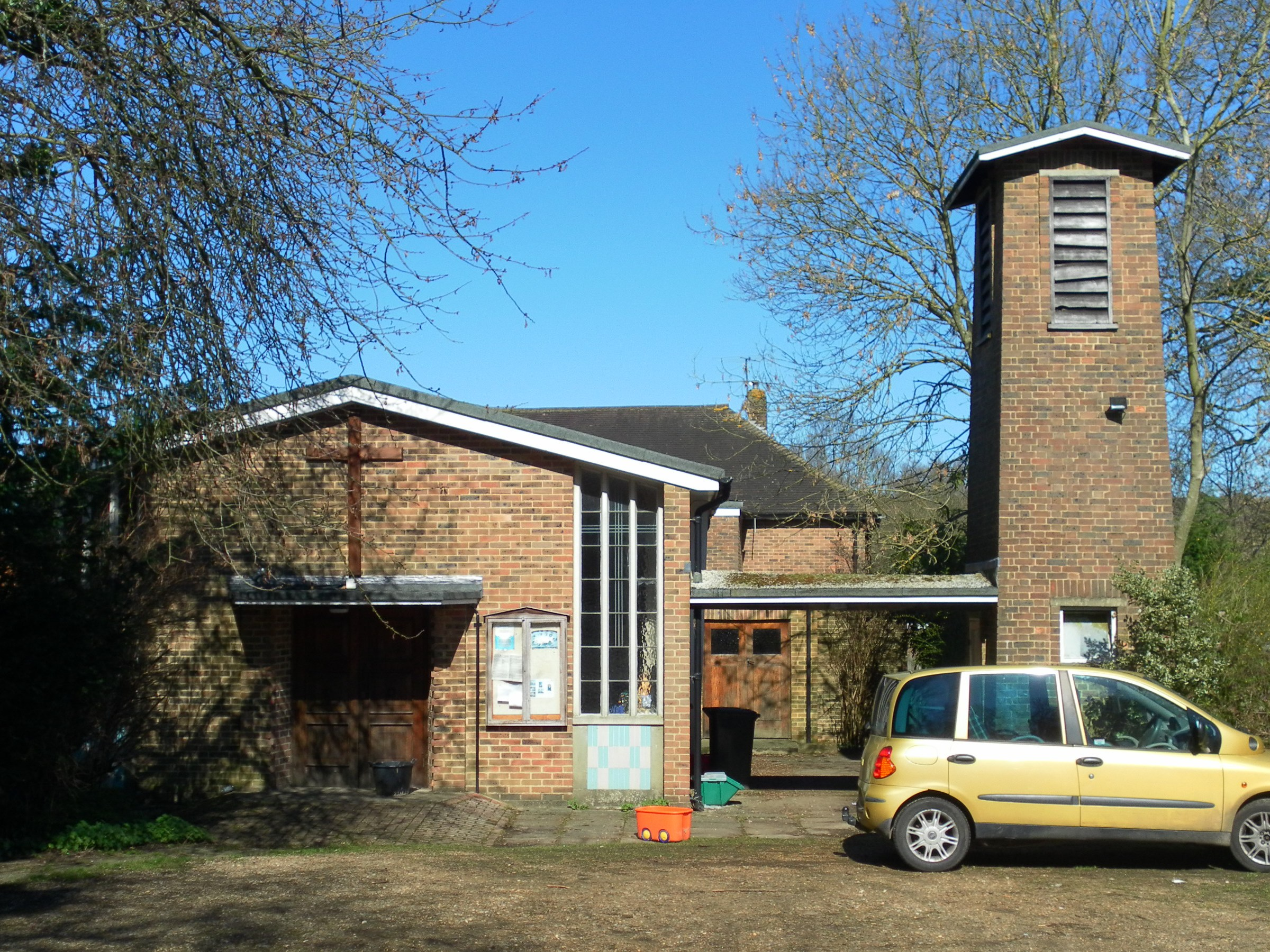
Our Lady of the Forest Church in Forest Row, closed in 2009.

== See also ==
- List of places of worship in Mid Sussex
- Roman Catholic Diocese of Arundel and Brighton
