= Forest Row =

Village and parish in East Sussex, England

Coordinates: 51°5′53.5″N 0°2′0.3″E

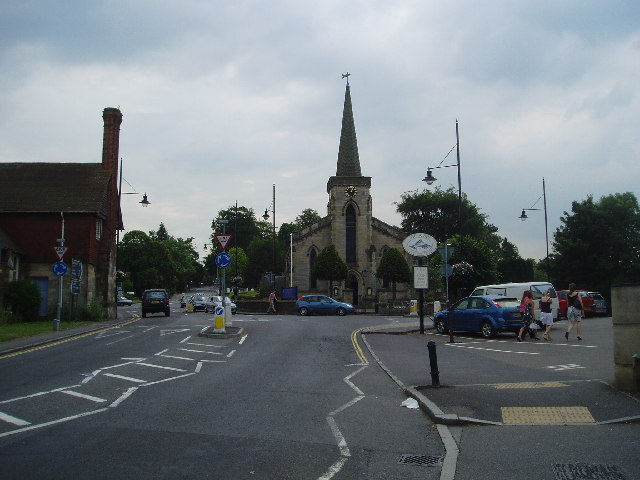
- The centre of Forest Row

- Location within East Sussex
- Area: 32.5 km^{2} (12.5 sq mi)
- Population: 4,954 (2011)
  - Density: 152/km^{2} (390/sq mi)
- OS grid reference: TQ427348
  - London: 29 miles (47 km) NNW
- Civil parish: Forest Row
- District: Wealden
- Shire county: East Sussex
- Region: South East
- Country: England
- Sovereign state: United Kingdom
- Post town: FOREST ROW
- Postcode district: RH18
- Dialling code: 01342
- Police: Sussex
- Fire: East Sussex
- Ambulance: South East Coast
- UK Parliament: Wealden
- Website: https://forestrow.gov.uk

Forest Row is a village and a large civil parish in the Wealden District of East Sussex, England. The village is located three miles (5 km) south-east of East Grinstead. In January 2023, it ranked as Britain's third poshest village.

== History ==
The village draws its name from its proximity to the Ashdown Forest, a royal hunting park first enclosed in the 13th century. From its origins as a small hamlet, Forest Row has grown, first with the establishment of a turnpike road in the 18th century; and later with the opening of the railway between East Grinstead and Tunbridge Wells in 1866; the line, which included an intermediate station at Forest Row, closed in 1967 as a result of the Beeching Axe (a programme of closures put forward by East Grinstead resident and British Railways Board Chairman Richard Beeching).

A part medieval public house the Yew Tree (now known as The Swan), was a centre of smuggling in the 18th century.

Brambletye House (known locally as Brambletye Castle) was built by Sir Henry Compton in 1631. This building features in the 1826 Horace Smith novel Brambletye House.

A mail coach robbery occurred at the bottom of Wall Hill on 27 June 1801. John Beatson and his adopted son William Whalley Beatson hid in a meadow at the foot of Wall Hill, by the entrance to an old Roman road. The mail coach made its way up Wall Hill, where it was stopped by them just after midnight. The Beatsons took between £4,000 and £5,000. Judge Baron Hotham sentenced the two men to death by hanging at the trial on 29 March 1802. Gallows were erected on the spot where the robbery took place, on 17 April 1802. Beatson and his adopted son were hanged in the presence of 3,000 people.

John F. Kennedy, the 35th President of the United States, came to Forest Row in June 1963 during his visit to the UK, attending mass at the Our Lady of the Forest church. At the time he was engaged in a series of discussions with the Prime Minister Harold Macmillan at his home in nearby Birch Grove. There is a plaque commemorating the visit on Freshfield Hall.

Forest Row became a Transition village in 2007 with the official unveiling in March 2008 at the Village Hall.

== Governance ==
An electoral ward in the same name exists. The population of this ward taken at the 2011 Census was 5,278.

== Geography ==
The civil parish of Forest Row is in the north-west corner of East Sussex, and borders West Sussex, Kent and Surrey. Ashdown Forest surrounds the village on three sides, and the upper reaches of the River Medway flow through the parish. The centre of the village lies at the intersection of the A22 road, the erstwhile turnpike, and the B2110 to Hartfield and Tunbridge Wells and there is a wide range of shops and businesses to serve the surrounding area.

Weir Wood Reservoir is a Site of Special Scientific Interest within the parish. It is also one of the largest areas of open water in the county and hosts a wide variety of resident and migrating birds.

The hotels in the village are The Brambletye Hotel, The Chequers and The Swan. In the 2006 radiation scare surrounding KGB agent Alexander Litvinenko the Ashdown Park Hotel and Country Club were closed for 6 hours and the nearby Roebuck hotel was used as an evacuation point for arriving guests. Italian security expert Mario Scaramella may have stayed there but tests showed no evidence of "radiation toxicity".

The village architecture is a mixture of traditional and modern. As well as many older cottages in the classic Sussex style there is a variety of more modern development, which generally blends in well. Gage Ridge and Michael Fields, with their copper-roofed houses are examples of the latter.

In addition to the businesses in the village centre, there is also an industrial estate.

== Religion ==
The Church of England ecclesiastical parish combines two churches: Holy Trinity, Forest Row, and St Dunstan's Ashurst Wood. There are also other denominational churches: The Christian Community Forest Row; a Baptist chapel; Providence church; and the cemetery chapel.

The Roman Catholic Our Lady of the Forest Church opened in the 1950s and closed on Christmas Day in 2009.

== Education ==
State education is provided at Forest Row CE Primary School. Greenfields School, which caters for children of all ages, is an independent school in the village which gives its students the opportunity to follow the teachings of L. Ron Hubbard, amongst other things. Institutions associated with the Anthroposophical movement of Rudolf Steiner are located in or near the village, notably Michael Hall, a Steiner Waldorf School offering education to children from kindergarten up to age 18 and Emerson College.

Ashdown House School, was a boarding/prep-school, that offered education to children between the ages of 7-13, serving as a feeder to prominent public schools in the UK. The school permanently closed at the end of the 2019-20 academic year due to financial pressure. The building itself was one of two only works in Sussex by Benjamin Henry Latrobe (best known as the architect responsible for parts of the Capitol in Washington).

== Leisure and culture ==
- The village hall was a gift for the people of Forest Row by the Alpine mountaineer Douglas Freshfield and his mother in memory of his son Henry Douglas Freshfield who died aged fourteen in 1891. The first Freshfield Hall was very short-lived, for it was burnt down on 14 February 1895, the day after the funeral of Henry Freshfield. Douglas Freshfield and his mother rebuilt and it reopened on 17 November 1895. At the reopening Freshfield expressed the wishes of his mother and himself when he hoped the hall would be used by all classes of parishioners, and that it would keep alive the memory of its original founder.
- The Forest Way, on the trackbed of the disused railway line, passes through the village from East Grinstead and continues eastwards as far as Groombridge, a total distance of 10 miles (14.5 km). Either side of the village the footpath is fairly level and is used primarily by pedestrians. Cyclists and horse riders can use the track, but must give pedestrians priority.
- The Royal Ashdown Forest Golf Club was established in 1889: there are two courses.

== Literary connections ==
- The Brambletye Inn was frequented by Sir Arthur Conan Doyle and features in "The Adventure of Black Peter", in which Sherlock Holmes and Dr Watson stay at the hotel in Forest Row whilst they investigate the murder of a retired sea captain.
- The film adaptation of John Fowles's novel The Collector, directed by William Wyler in 1965, contains locations (at the close of the film) shot in Forest Row.
- Writer Helen Humphreys describes staying with her paternal grandmother at Ashcroft as an aspiring novelist in her 2013 memoir Nocturne.
- Arthur Owen Barfield (9 November 1898 – 14 December 1997), English philosopher, author, poet, critic, and member of the Inklings. Retired to Forest Row after the death of his wife in 1980.

== Twin towns ==
- Milly-la-Forêt, France

== Notable people ==
There have been several notable residents of Forest Row in the recent past and present. These include: Owen Barfield, the writer and philosopher, Ben Elton, the comedian and novelist, David Gilmour from the band Pink Floyd, Violet Needham, author, Richard Jones, bass player and background singer in the Feeling, Jonael Schickler, a Swiss philosopher and Sean Yates, professional cyclist. The singer Engelbert Humperdinck had a holiday cottage in the village during the 1980s. Actor Ed Sanders is from Forest Row. American-born DJ and producer Secondcity (real name Rowan Harrington) lived in Forest Row having moved there when he was 12. Noted amateur golfer and writer Horace Hutchinson called Forest Row his home in the late 1920s and early 1930s, before his death in 1932.
