= Our Lady of the Forest Church, Forest Row =

Coordinates: 51°05′41.8″N 0°02′51.1″E

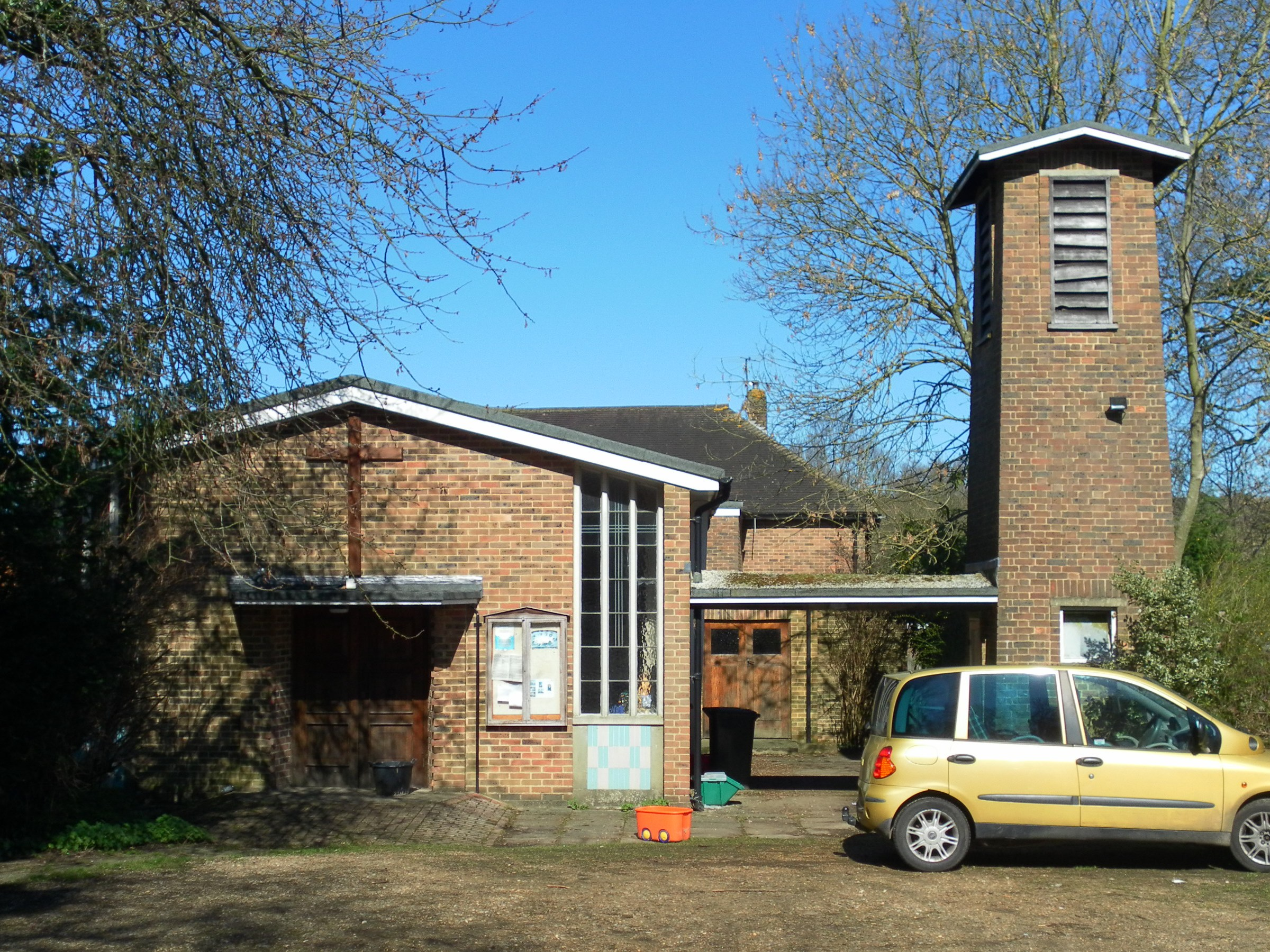
Our Lady of the Forest Church in 2011

Our Lady of the Forest Church was a Roman Catholic church in Forest Row, a village in East Sussex in southern England. It was built in the 1950s, and in 1963 had US President John F. Kennedy attending mass. It closed in 2009 and was subsequently redeveloped into residential housing.

== History ==
The Roman Catholic Archdiocese of Southwark built the church in the 1950s, and the place was registered for marriages in February 1959. In 1965, the Diocese of Arundel and Brighton was established from part of Southwark's territory and took over responsibility for the church.

=== 1963 Kennedy visit ===
John F. Kennedy, then President of the United States, attended mass at the church on 30 June 1963, the first time an American president had done so on English soil. Kennedy had been staying at Birch Grove, the family residence of the British Prime Minister Harold Macmillan during his only official visit to the United Kingdom. Kennedy travelled to the church in a large motorcade of police and Secret Service agents. Crowds were present along the route as well as campaigners for nuclear disarmament. Kennedy and Macmillan had been discussing what would eventually become the Partial Nuclear Test Ban Treaty at Birch Grove.

The parish priest, Fr Charles P. Dolman, omitted his typical 15-minute sermon due to constraints on Kennedy's time, but expressed gratitude that "one of the world's leading Catholics should be with us in our little wayside chapel this morning". Kennedy shook hands with villagers outside the church as he left after the mass.

Kennedy was accompanied by Philip de Zulueta, a fellow Roman Catholic and private secretary to MacMillan. On his way to and from the church Kennedy's sole topic of conversation was sexual gossip connected to the Profumo affair, much to Zulueta's astonishment; MacMillan was shocked by reports of Kennedy's conversations.

Kennedy was assassinated in November, less than six months after his visit. MacMillan subsequently unveiled a memorial plaque to Kennedy at Forest Row Village Hall. Kennedy's visit to the church was commemorated by a small plaque, now found in the East Grinstead Church; a memorial mass was subsequently held on the anniversary of his visit for several years.

=== Closure and redevelopment ===
The church closed after mass on Christmas Day in 2009, despite having a regular congregation of between 50 and 90 at the time. The primary reason for the closure was a shortage of priests; retired priests were conducting services at the church in the absence of the parish priest, Fr Steven Purnell.

Following the closure of the church, the congregation moved to Our Lady and St Peter's Church in nearby East Grinstead, and the fittings and vestments were moved to the parish of the Immaculate Heart of Mary in Kwadaso-Kumasi in the Archdiocese of Kumasi, Ghana.

In 2024, a planning application was submitted to convert the site, located at 88 Hartfield Road, into residential housing. The plan included the conversion of the church into two apartments, a further house to be built within the space of the front car park, and the demolition of the church tower. The application received no objections.

== See also ==
- List of former places of worship in Wealden
