= Isabel Hill =

British poet and translator

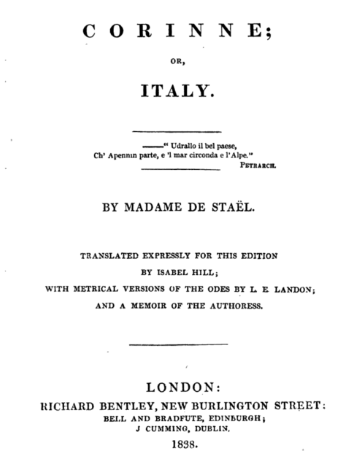
- Born: 21 August 1800; Bristol
- Died: January 1842; Brompton
- Occupations: Translator, playwright

Isabel Hill (1800–1842) was a British translator, playwright, and poet. Her most notable work is her English translation of the French novel Corinne, or Italy which is still used today.

== Life ==
Isabel Hill was born on 21 August, 1800 in Bristol, England, to parents William Hill and Isabel Hill (née Savage). She had three older brothers, the most notable being Benson Earle Hill, to whom she was closest. From an early age, Isabel was encouraged by both her mother – who wrote poetry – and her brother – a future writer – to become a writer.

From the age of about 17 until she died, Isabel lived with her brother Benson; first in Dover in 1817, and later she officially moved in with him in Woolwich in 1820. She lived there alone for a period of time when Benson joined the army. In 1822, her brother left the army and became an actor. During this time, Isabel began to travel around England and Scotland as she wrote. From 1827 to 1834, Isabel and Benson lived in Cecil Street in Strand, London, before finally moving to Brompton.

== Career ==
Isabel Hill wrote poetry throughout her childhood and was always interested in languages. She regretted that her childhood school had not taught her ancient languages like Greek or Latin. Isabel was determined to be a writer. She always knew that working as an actor or teacher would be more attainable, but she continued to write. She published her first poem in 1818.

Her first successful piece of writing was published in 1820: a five act tragedy, The Poet’s Child. Covent Garden had rejected the verse drama but the play sold well. The London Magazine gave the play a good review and compared Isabel's poetry favourably with that of Felicia Hemans – a popular poet regarded as the "leading female poet of her day".

After this success, more of her writing was published, including Constance. A Tale. (1822), and in 1823 she published a poem titled Zaphna, or, The Amulet. During this time, Isabel had problems with one of her publishers, W. G. Graham, who swindled her out of the profits these pieces were accumulating.

Isabel went on to write another five act tragedy titled Brian, the Probationer, Or, The Red Hand. Like her previous five act play, this was also rejected by Covent Garden and was not published until after her death. However, at the time it was written it received praise from stage actors William Macready and Charles Kemble.

In 1833, Isabel's most well-known work was published: a translation of Corinne, or Italy – a French romance novel written by Germaine de Staël that tells the story of an Italian poet and an English nobleman. Isabel spent six weeks translating the novel from French to English. Hill's translation was the most well-read translation of her time and was still being reprinted forty years after its original publication.

== Illness and death ==
Isabel Hill suffered her whole life with tuberculosis, from which she died in January 1842 in Brompton.
