= The New Monthly Magazine =

British monthly magazine

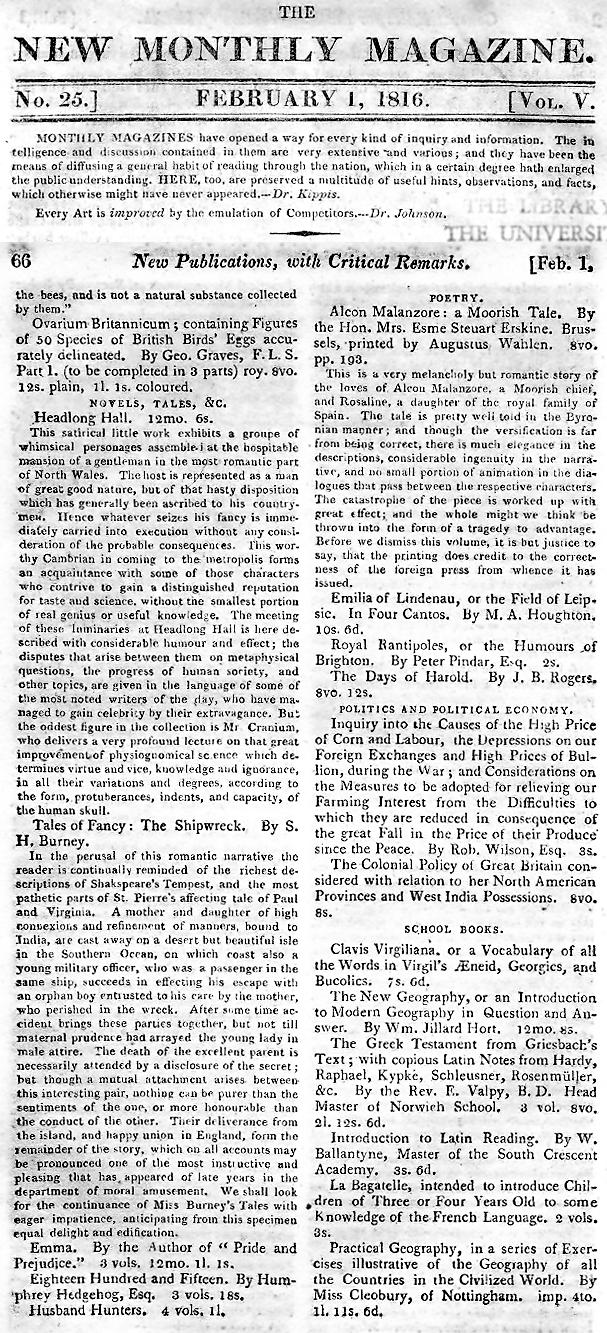
The New Monthly Magazine for February 1, 1816

The New Monthly Magazine was a British monthly magazine published from 1814 to 1884. It was founded by Henry Colburn and published by him through to 1845.

== History ==
Colburn and Frederic Shoberl established The New Monthly Magazine and Universal Register as a "virulently Tory" competitor to Sir Richard Phillips' Monthly Magazine in 1814. "The double-column format and the comprehensive contents combined The Gentleman's Magazine with The Annual Register".

In its April 1819 issue it published John Polidori's Gothic fiction The Vampyre, the first significant piece of prose vampire literature in English, attributing it to Lord Byron, who partly inspired it.

In 1821 Colburn recast the magazine with a more literary and less political focus, retitling it The New Monthly Magazine and Literary Journal. Nominally edited by the poet Thomas Campbell, most editing fell to the sub-editor Cyrus Redding. Colburn paid contributors well, and they included Sydney Morgan, Thomas Charles Morgan, Peter George Patmore, Mary Shelley, Charles Lamb, Leigh Hunt, Stendhal, Thomas Noon Talfourd, Letitia Elizabeth Landon, Felicia Hemans, Ugo Foscolo, Richard Lalor Sheil, Mary Russell Mitford, Edward Bulwer, James and Horace Smith, and William Hazlitt. Hazlitt's "Table-Talk" essays, begun in the London Magazine, appeared in the New Monthly from late 1821, his essay "The Fight" appeared in 1822, and his series "The Spirits of the Age'" was later republished, with essays from other sources, in the book The Spirit of the Age (1825).

Charles Knight's The London Magazine merged with the New Monthly in 1829, and in that year Richard Bentley became Colburn's business partner. After Redding resigned in 1830, Campbell found himself unable to edit the magazine on his own and Samuel Carter Hall became editor for a year. In 1831 the novelist Edward Bulwer became editor, turning "the essentially apolitical, slightly Whiggish, literary journal into a vigorous radical organ shouting 'Reform' at the top of its lungs." Hall, a political Conservative, had remained as sub-editor, and resisted Bulwer's efforts: Bulwer resigned in 1833, with Hall taking up the editorship once more. Contributors now included Catherine Gore, Anna Maria Hall, Letitia Elizabeth Landon, Felicia Hemans, Caroline Norton, Thomas Haynes Bayly, and Theodore Edward Hook.

In 1837 the magazine was retitled The New Monthly Magazine and Humorist, to meet the challenge of Bentley's Miscellany. Now edited by Theodore Hook, it published contributions from Leigh Hunt, Douglas Jerrold, Frederick Marryat, Frances Trollope, Charles Robert Forrester, and W. M. Thackeray. Upon Hook's death in 1841, Thomas Hood was editor until 1843.

In 1845 Colburn sold the magazine for £2500 to William Harrison Ainsworth, who had earlier edited Bentley's Miscellany and who now edited his own Ainsworth's Magazine. Ainsworth edited the New Monthly with his cousin William Francis Ainsworth as sub-editor. From 1871–79 William Francis Ainsworth was editor.

== Titles ==
Over the years, the magazine had several titles. These are listed at Periodicals Online, and comprise:

- The New Monthly Magazine and Universal Register – February 1814 to December 1820
- The New Monthly Magazine and Literary Journal – January 1821 to December 1836
- The New Monthly Magazine and Humorist – January 1837 to December 1852
- The New Monthly Magazine – January 1853 to December 1881
- The New Monthly – January to October 1882.

== Editors ==
The editorship of the New Monthly Magazine was complicated by the frequent use of a deputy position, or "working editor". Hook, Hood, Ainsworth, and Ainsworth alone are named on bound volume title pages.

- 1814 Frederic Shoberl
- John Watkins
- 1819 Alaric Alexander Watts
- 1821 Edward Dubois, one issue only
- 1821–1830 Thomas Campbell
- 1821–1830 Cyrus Redding de facto editor
- 1830 Samuel Carter Hall, sub-editor and then editor
- 1831–1833 Edward Bulwer-Lytton
- 1837–1841 Theodore Hook
- 1837–1841 Benson Earle Hill, assistant
- 1841–1843 Thomas Hood
- 1841–1853 Peter George Patmore
- 1845–1870 William Harrison Ainsworth proprietor-editor
- 1871 William Francis Ainsworth
