= Brambletye House =

1826 novel

- Author: Horace Smith
- Language: English
- Genre: Historical
- Publisher: Henry Colburn
- Publication date: 1826
- Publication place: United Kingdom
- Media type: Print

Brambletye House is an 1826 historical novel by the British writer Horace Smith, originally published in three volumes. It was published in London by Henry Colburn. It takes its title from Brambletye House, a Jacobean house near Forest Row in East Sussex of which some ruins still remain. It takes place in the English Commonwealth, during the rule of Oliver Cromwell in the aftermath of the English Civil War. The focus is of a country family of broadly pro-Cavalier sympathies. Although the book is largely pro-Royalist, it is less sympathetic to the post-Restoration rule of Charles II and James II.

A popular success, it rapidly went through multiple editions. John Sutherland considers it as probably Smith's best work of fiction while The Concise Oxford Companion to English Literature describes it as "a pale shadow of Scott's Woodstock" which was published the same year.

== Bibliography ==
- Birch, Dinah & Hooper, Katy (ed.) The Concise Oxford Companion to English Literature. OUP, 2013.
- Latané, David E. William Maginn and the British Press: A Critical Biography. Routledge, 2016.
- Mendlesohn, Farah. Creating Memory: Historical Fiction and the English Civil Wars. Springer Nature, 2020.
- Sutherland, John. The Longman Companion to Victorian Fiction. Routledge, 2014.
