= Benson E. Hill =

English writer, soldier and epicure

Benson Earle Hill
- Born: 1795
- Died: 1845 (aged 49–50)

Signature
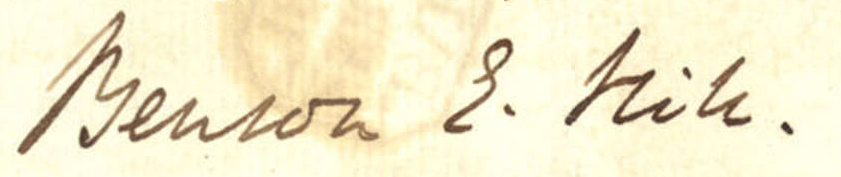

Benson Earle Hill (c. 1795 – 1845) was a nineteenth century English writer, soldier and epicure.

== Life ==
Hill was born in 1795.

He lived with his sister Isabel Hill in 1820 and this was a life-long friendship. They had lived together before for several months in 1817 in Dover. Their parents were Isabel (born Savage) and William Hill. His god parent was William Benson Earle who had also employed their paternal grandfather. Isabel Hill was his younger sister who had been born in 1800 in Bristol.

In addition to a number of stand alone works he was a contributor to The New Monthly Magazine. He was a correspondent of Leigh Hunt and Charles Dickens.

Until her death in 1842 he lived with his sister, Isabel, who was a playwright, poet and translator. He is creditted on her 1842 posthumous work.

== Bibliography ==
- Recollections of an artillery officer: including scenes and adventures in Ireland, America, Flanders and France (1836)
- A Pinch of Snuff: Composed of Curious Particulars and Original Anecdotes of Snuff Taking; as well as a review of snuff, snuff-boxes, snuff-shops, snuff-takers, and snuff-papers; with the moral and physical effects of snuff (1840) as Pollexenes Digit Snift, Dean of Brazen-Nose London, Robert Tyas.
- The epicure's almanac; or, Diary of good living; containing a choice and original receipt or a valuable hint for every day in the year, London, How and Parsons, (1841)
- Playing about; or Theatrical anecdotes and adventures, with scenes of general nature, from the life; in England, Scotland, and Ireland, London, (1840)
