= Portrait of Thomas Campbell =

1820 painting by Thomas Lawrence

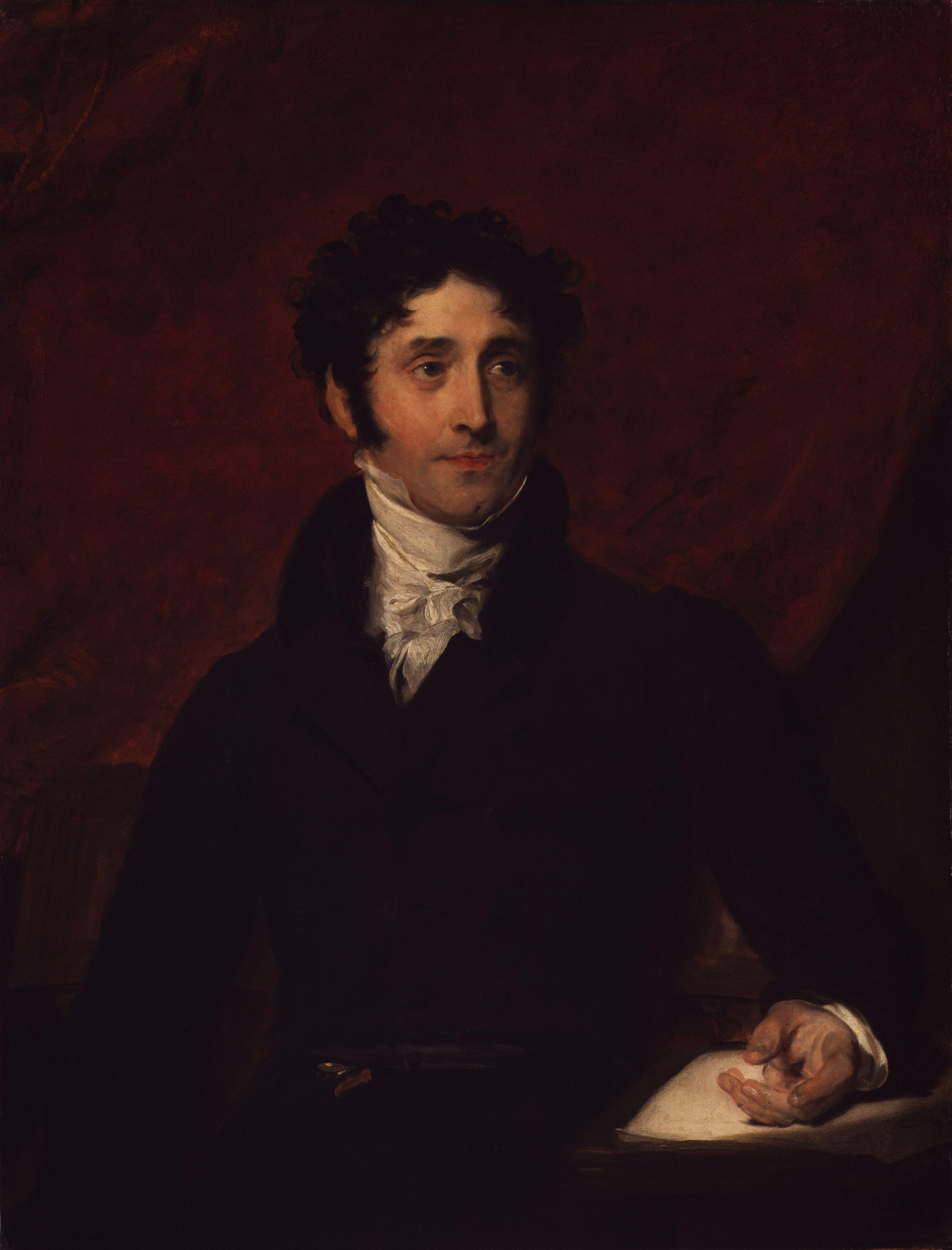
- Artist: Thomas Lawrence
- Year: 1820
- Type: Oil on canvas, portrait painting
- Dimensions: 91.4 cm × 71.1 cm (36.0 in × 28.0 in)
- Location: National Portrait Gallery; London

Portrait of Thomas Campbell is an 1820 portrait painting by the British artist Thomas Lawrence. It depicts the Scottish writer Thomas Campbell. Both men were key figures of Romanticism during the Regency era. Campbell was a noted poet who became a friend of Lawrence. Following the artist's death Campbell was approached to write a biography of him but passed all the relevant details on to another author.

Around a decade earlier Lawrence had produced a drawn a sketch featuring Campbell. The sittings for the finished painting may have taken place several years before the paintings completion. While the painting was not exhibited during Lawrence's lifetime, in 1868 it was part of the significant Exhibition of National Portraits held at Victoria and Albert Museum in South Kensington. Today the painting is in the collection of the National Portrait Gallery in London, having been acquired in 1865 through a gift from the Duke of Buccleuch. A reproduction of the painting was used as the frontispiece for the 1828 book The Poetical Works.

== Bibliography ==
- Levey, Michael. Sir Thomas Lawrence. Yale University Press, 2005.
- Lloyd, Stephen & Sloan, Kim. The Intimate Portrait: Drawings, Miniatures and Pastels from Ramsay to Lawrence National Galleries of Scotland, 2008.
