= Rejected Addresses =

1812 book by James and Horace Smith

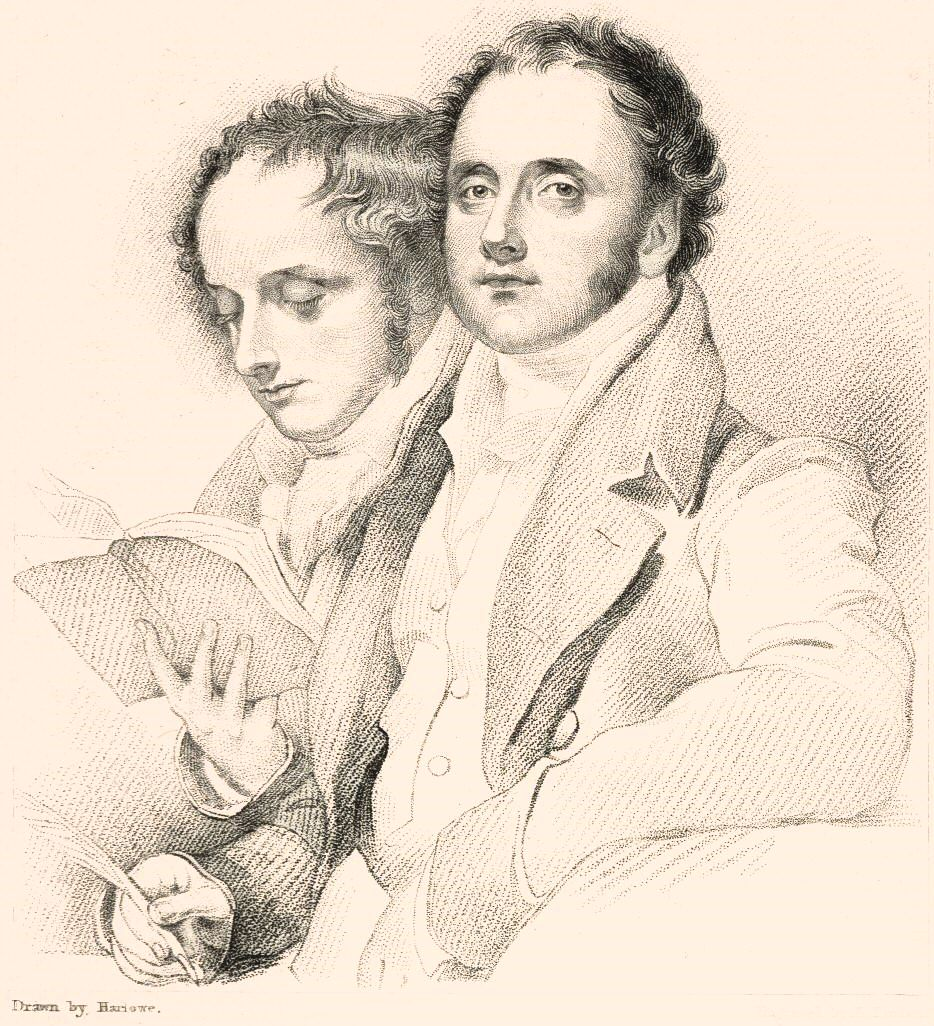
James and Horace Smith, authors of the Rejected Addresses

Rejected Addresses was an 1812 book of parodies by the brothers James and Horace Smith. In the line of 18th-century pastiches focussed on a single subject in the style of poets of the time, it contained twenty-one good-natured pastiches of contemporary authors. The book's popular success set the fashion for a number of later works of the same kind.

== Precursors ==
Although parody is a long-standing literary genre, the mock heroic of Augustan times began to share its territory with parody, using the deflationary inversion of values - comparing small things with great - as a satirical tool in the deconstruction of the epic style. A later humorous tactic, in place of a connected narrative in the mock-epic manner, was to apply poems in the style of varied authors to a single deflationary subject. The ultimate forerunner of this approach has been identified with Isaac Brown's small work, A Pipe of Tobacco, in Imitation of Six Several Authors, first published in 1736. In that case the poets Colley Cibber, Ambrose Philips, James Thomson, Edward Young, Alexander Pope and Jonathan Swift were used as the focus for its series of good-natured parodic variations. The popularity of these was attested by many subsequent editions and by their reproduction in the poetical miscellanies of after decades.

A new direction was given to this departure by employing parody as a weapon in the political conflicts of the 1790s. This was particularly identified with the Anti-Jacobin, where the works of poets identified with liberal tendencies were treated with satirical humour. An anthology of such parodies, The Poetry of the Anti-Jacobin, followed in 1800 and its popularity guaranteed frequent editions over the following decades. Although the name of their targets are generally not mentioned, a clue is usually given by way of preface or notes, sometimes quoting the opening lines. Robert Southey was a particular victim in early numbers of the weekly, in which his lofty sentiments were downgraded to ridiculous bathos. For his "Inscription for the apartment in Chepstow Castle, where Henry Martin the regicide was imprisoned thirty years" was substituted the Newgate Prison cell of a drunken "Elizabeth Brownrigg the Prentice-cide" (I). And Southey's humanitarian themes clothed in experimental metres were rewritten as "The friend of humanity and the knife-grinder" (II) and the subversive "The Soldier’s Friend" (V).

Later numbers took as their target speculative philosophical and scientific works aiming at popular acceptance by being clothed in verse. Richard Payne Knight’s The Progress of Civil Society (1796) became the satirical "The Progress of Man" (XV, XVI, XXI). This was later ascribed to the fictitious "Mr Higgins of St Mary Axe", author as well of "The Loves of the Triangles" (XXIII, XXIV, XXVI, a parody of Erasmus Darwin’s verse treatise The Loves of the Plants (1791) mingled with gallophile propaganda. He also reappears as author of "The Rovers" (XXX – XXXI), an imitation seemingly based on contemporary translations of popular German melodramas.

== Rejected Addresses ==
The widened parodic focus from poetry to drama in the Anti-Jacobin was taken even further in the Rejected Addresses of 1812, in which works in prose were made additional targets. The occasion given for its publication was a public competition advertised in the press for an address to be spoken at the reopening of the Drury Lane Theatre, which had been destroyed by fire. As none of the actual entries were considered adequate in the end, Lord Byron was commissioned to write one specially. But when the brothers James and Horace Smith heard of the result of the competition, they planned a volume of parodies of writers of the day, to be published as supposed failed entries and issued to coincide with the theatre’s opening.

Titled Rejected Addresses: Or, The New Theatrum Poetarum, the book’s contents were as follows:

No.	Title	Pretended Author	Written by
I	Loyal Effusion	W. T. F. (William Thomas Fitzgerald)	Horace Smith
II	The Baby’s Debut	W. W. (William Wordsworth)	James Smith
III	An Address Without a Phœnix	S. T. P. : a genuine rejected address by -	Horace Smith
IV	Cui Bono?	Lord B. (Lord Byron)	James and Horace
V	Hampshire Farmer’s Address	W. C. (William Cobbett)	James
VI	The Living Lustres	T. M. (Thomas Moore)	Horace
VII	The Rebuilding	R. S. (Robert Southey)	James
VIII	Drury’s Dirge	Laura Matilda, a Della Cruscan poet	Horace
IX	A Tale of Drury Lane	W. S. (Walter Scott)	Horace
X	Johnson’s Ghost	Samuel Johnson	Horace
XI	The Beautiful Incendiary	Hon. W. S. (William Robert Spencer)	Horace
XII	Fire and Ale	M. G. L. (Matthew Gregory Lewis)	Horace
XIII	Playhouse Musings	S. T. C. (Samuel Taylor Coleridge)	James
XIV	Drury Lane Hustings	"A new halfpenny ballad by a Pic-Nic Poet"	James
XV	Architectural Atoms	"Translated by Dr. B." (Thomas Busby)	Horace
XVI	Theatrical Alarm-Bell	"By the Editor of the M. P." (Morning Post)	James
XVII	The Theatre	Rev. G. C. (George Crabbe)	James
XVIII	Macbeth Travestie	Momus Medlar (William Shakespeare)	James
XIX	Stranger Travestie	Momus Medlar (August von Kotzebue)	James
XX	George Barnwell Travestie	Momus Medlar (George Lillo)	James
XXI	Punch’s Apotheosis	T. H. (Theodore Hook)	Horace

The work was an immediate success. When Byron became acquainted with the travesty of his Childe Harold's Pilgrimage in "Cui Bono?" he asked his publisher to pass on the message, "Tell the author I forgive him, were he twenty times our satirist, and think his imitations not at all inferior to the famous ones of Hawkins Browne". Francis Jeffrey, writing later in The Edinburgh Review, recognised another strand in the work's ancestry: "We have seen nothing comparable to it since the publication of The Poetry of the Anti-Jacobin".

Byron's sympathy is understandable, since only three years before he had pilloried some of the same targets as the Smiths in his own satire of "English Bards and Scotch Reviewers". Apostrophised in its opening lines, in the same position as in the Rejected Addresses, appears Fitzgerald, "one of the foremost loyalist versifiers of his day":

Still must I hear? -shall hoarse Fitzgerald bawl
His creaking couplets in a tavern hall?

Also deplored are the "too profuse" heroic narrative of Robert Southey and the "stale romance" of Walter Scott, the latter deflated in the Rejected Addresses by the mock-heroic trick of substituting the plebeian names of Clutterbuck, Muggins and Higginbottom for the protagonists. The joint authors of the Lyrical Ballads are also dismissed: Wordsworth for his "childish verse", parodied by James Smith in "The Baby’s Debut"; and Coleridge, ridiculed by Byron for his address "To a Young Ass" as "the laureate of the long-eared kind", who passes from the same subject to his "Playhouse Musings" in the Rejected Addresses. Another common target is "spectre-mongering Lewis". Byron, however, thought more highly of Crabbe than did James Smith of his pedestrian "truth to nature".

== Sequels ==
Profiting from the delighted discussion caused by the parodies, an enterprising publisher went ahead and published a selection of the genuine failed entries, prefaced by Lord Byron's specially commissioned address from the actual occasion of the opening. Included in the new work's "mawkish mélange of decasyllabic dullness", the Monthly Review identified victims already parodied by the Smith brothers such as Fitzgerald and Dr Busby, and heartily seconded the committee's original decision to reject them.

Further imitations of the work of the Smiths quickly followed in A Sequel to the "Rejected Addresses" Or, the Theatrum Poetarum Minorum (1813). This too hid its targets under their initials and was similarly aimed at literary enthusiasms of the time: a labouring class effusion by Robert Bloomfield, followed by a defence of "Plebeian Talent" by Capell Lofft, the champion of such work (pp.6-26); a poem for children by Anna Laetitia Barbauld (p.61); a prose poem by the much imitated Ossian (pp. 75-9); a sequence of sonnets of sensibility by William Lisle Bowles (pp. 80-82). The Monthly Review obligingly identified the victims in its dismissive critique.

In the same year, William Stanley's farce, The Rejected Addresses: Or, The Triumph of the Ale-king, was published, professing in the preface that it "owes its existence to The Theatrum Poetarum". In it various stereotypical poets throng the streets outside the theatre, clamouring for their competition entries to be heard. Among the farcical targets are the opening lines of Fitzgerald's entry in the original Rejected Addresses, and Nancy Drew's nursery narrative, with Wordsworth's supposed authorship disguised under the name of Mr Winandermere.

At the other end of the century, the scholarly Notes and Queries published a list of other literary parodies, among which two further successors to the Rejected Addresses are noted. Peter George Patmore's Rejected Articles (1826) is a prose equivalent, imitating the style of articles in magazines of the day, among which feature the two Smith brothers themselves and William Cobbett, the target of their earlier work. The other successor is William Frederick Deacon's Warreniana (1824), a mixture of prose and verse with, as a common focus, the advertisement of a commercial blacking product. Among the poetical works featured are "Old Cumberland Pedlar" by W. W., "Carmen Triumphale" by R. S., "The Childe's Pilgrimage" by Lord B., "The Dream: a psychological curiosity" by S. T. C. and "The Battle of Brentford Green" by Sir W. S.
