= Cyrus Redding =

British journalist and wine writer

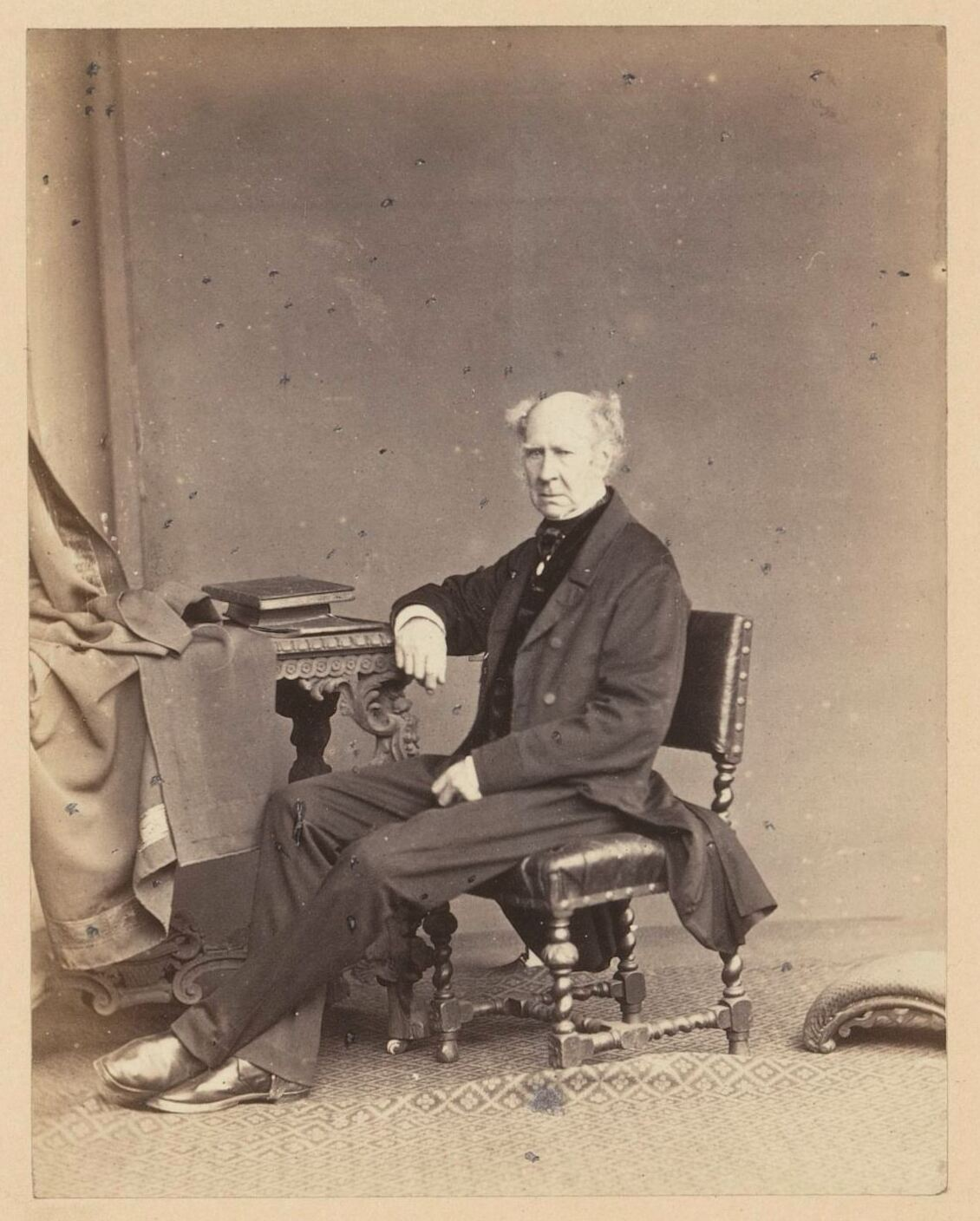
Portrait of Cyrus Redding, RPF-2001-7-349-66 (cropped)

Cyrus Redding (1785–1870) was a British journalist and wine writer.

== Biography ==
Redding was born in Cornwall. The son of a Baptist minister, he was privately educated. He moved to London about 1806, and worked for the Pilot (est. 1807) before editing the Plymouth Chronicle and then the West Briton and Cornwall Advertiser which he founded in 1810.

Travelling to Paris in 1814, Redding edited Galignani's Messenger from 1815 to 1818, as well as providing Paris correspondence for the Examiner.

Between 1821 and 1830 Redding effectively edited The New Monthly Magazine (owned by Henry Colburn, and nominally edited by Thomas Campbell). From 1831 to 1833 Redding and Campbell edited The Metropolitan Magazine. He edited the Bath Guardian (1834–5) and the Staffordshire Examiner (1836–40). In 1841 he made two unsuccessful attempts to found journals, the English Journal and London Journal.

After that time he abandoned journalism for the writing of books. To his earlier novel, Gabrielle (1829), a children's book on shipwrecks (1833) and his history of wine (1833), he now began a series of county histories, memoirs of William Beckford and Thomas Campbell, and volumes of autobiography and reminiscences.

== Works ==
- 1829 -- Gabrielle: a Tale of the Swiss Mountains. London: John Ebbers & Co.
- 1833 -- Shipwrecks and Disasters at Sea with Jean Louis Hubert Simon de Perthes. London: Whittaker, Treacher, & Co. OCLC 11167341
- 1833 -- A history and description of modern wines. London: Whittaker, Treacher, & Arnot. OCLC 6498122
- 1839 -- Every Man His Own Butler. London: Whittaker & Co. OCLC 25057151
- 1842 -- An illustrated itinerary of the county of Cornwall. London: How and Parsons. OCLC 7479019
- 1844 -- An illustrated itinerary of the county of Lancaster. London: Routledge. OCLC 23367567
- 1846 -- Velasco. London: T.C. Newby. OCLC 10905947
- 1859 -- Memoirs of William Beckford of Fonthill, with William Beckford. London: C.J. Skeet. OCLC 17562678
- 1858 -- Fifty Years' Recollections, Literary and Personal, with Observations on Men and Things 3 vols. London: C.J. Skeet. OCLC 2555786
- 1860 -- Literary reminiscences and memoirs of Thomas Campbell. London: C.J. Skeet. OCLC 5622942
- 1867 -- Personal Reminiscences of Eminent Men. London: Saunders, Otley. OCLC 2096122
