= Battle of the Baltic (poem) =

"The Battle of the Baltic" is a poem by Scottish writer Thomas Campbell.

"The Battle of the Baltic" is an upbeat, patriotic poem written in 1801. Its subject is the naval Battle of Copenhagen, fought earlier that year between the fleets of Britain and Denmark.

Its first lines run:

Of Nelson and the North
Sing the glorious day's renown,
When to battle fierce came forth
All the might of Denmark's crown,
And her arms along the deep proudly shone...

British composer Alexandra Thomson wrote a setting of "The Battle of the Baltic" for orchestra and chorus, which was performed at the 1890 Hovingham Festival.
