= Horace Smith (poet) =

English poet and novelist (1779–1849)

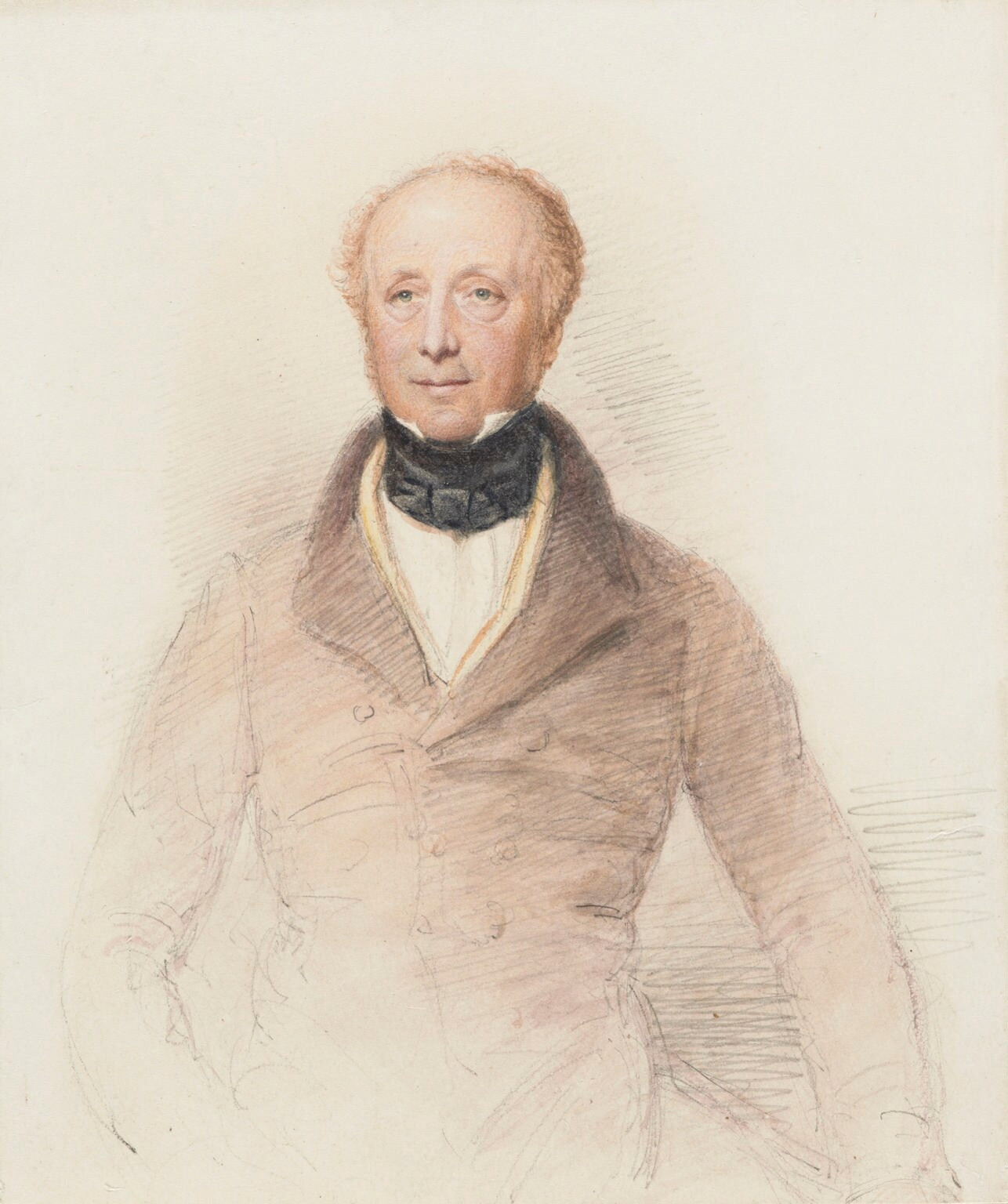
- Portrait, c. 1840
- Born: Horatio Smith; 31 December 1779; London
- Died: 12 July 1849 (aged 69); Tunbridge Wells
- Occupations: Poet, novelist
- Writing career
- Literary movement: Romanticism

Horatio Smith (31 December 1779 – 12 July 1849) was an English poet and novelist. In 1818, he participated in a sonnet-writing competition with Percy Bysshe Shelley. It was of Smith that Shelley said: "Is it not odd that the only truly generous person I ever knew who had money enough to be generous with should be a stockbroker? He writes poetry and pastoral dramas and yet knows how to make money, and does make it, and is still generous."

== Biography ==
Smith was born in London, the fifth of eight children, son of Robert Smith (1747–1832) F.R.S. and his wife Mary Bogle. His niece was the poet Maria Abdy. He was educated at Chigwell School with his elder brother James Smith, also a writer. Horace first came to public attention in 1812 at the time of the rebuilding of the Drury Lane Theatre, after it had burnt down; the managers offered a prize of £50 for an address to be recited at the Theatre's reopening in October. The Smith brothers wrote parodies of poets of the day, supposedly their failed entries in the competition, and sold the collection under the title Rejected Addresses. James parodied Wordsworth, Southey, Coleridge and Crabbe, while Horace parodied Byron, Moore, Scott and Bowles.

Smith went on to become a prosperous stockbroker. He travelled with family in continental Europe from 1821 to 1825. Returning to England, he first took a house in Tunbridge Wells, and then moved to Brighton in 1826. He died at Tunbridge Wells on 12 July 1849.

== Works ==
The Rejected Addresses, with seven editions within three months, still stands the most widely popular parodies ever published in the country. The book was written without malice; none of the poets caricatured took offence, while the imitation is so clever that both Byron and Scott claimed that they could scarcely believe they had not written the addresses ascribed to them. The only other collaboration by the two brothers was Horace in London (1813). His comedy play First Impressions was performed at Drury Lane in 1813.

Smith knew Shelley as a member of the circle around Leigh Hunt. Smith helped to manage Shelley's finances. Sonnet-writing competitions were not uncommon; Shelley and Smith wrote competing sonnets on the subject of the Nile River. Inspired by Diodorus Siculus (Book 1, Chapter 47), they each wrote and submitted a sonnet on the subject to The Examiner. Shelley's "Ozymandias" was published on 11 January 1818 under the pen name Glirastes, and Smith's poem of the same title was published on 1 February 1818 with the same title under the initials H.S. (and was later renamed in his collection Amarynthus as On a Stupendous Leg of Granite, Discovered Standing by Itself in the Deserts of Egypt, with the Inscription Inserted Below).

After making his fortune in business, Horace Smith produced around twenty historical novels: Brambletye House (1826), Tor Hill (1826), Reuben Apsley (1827), Zillah (1828), The New Forest (1829), Walter Colyton (1830), among others. Three volumes of Gaieties and Gravities, published by him in 1826, contain many clever essays both in verse and prose, but the only piece that remains much remembered is the " Address to the Mummy in Belzoni's Exhibition." (see Giovanni Battista Belzoni)
