= James Smith (writer) =

English writer (1775–1839)

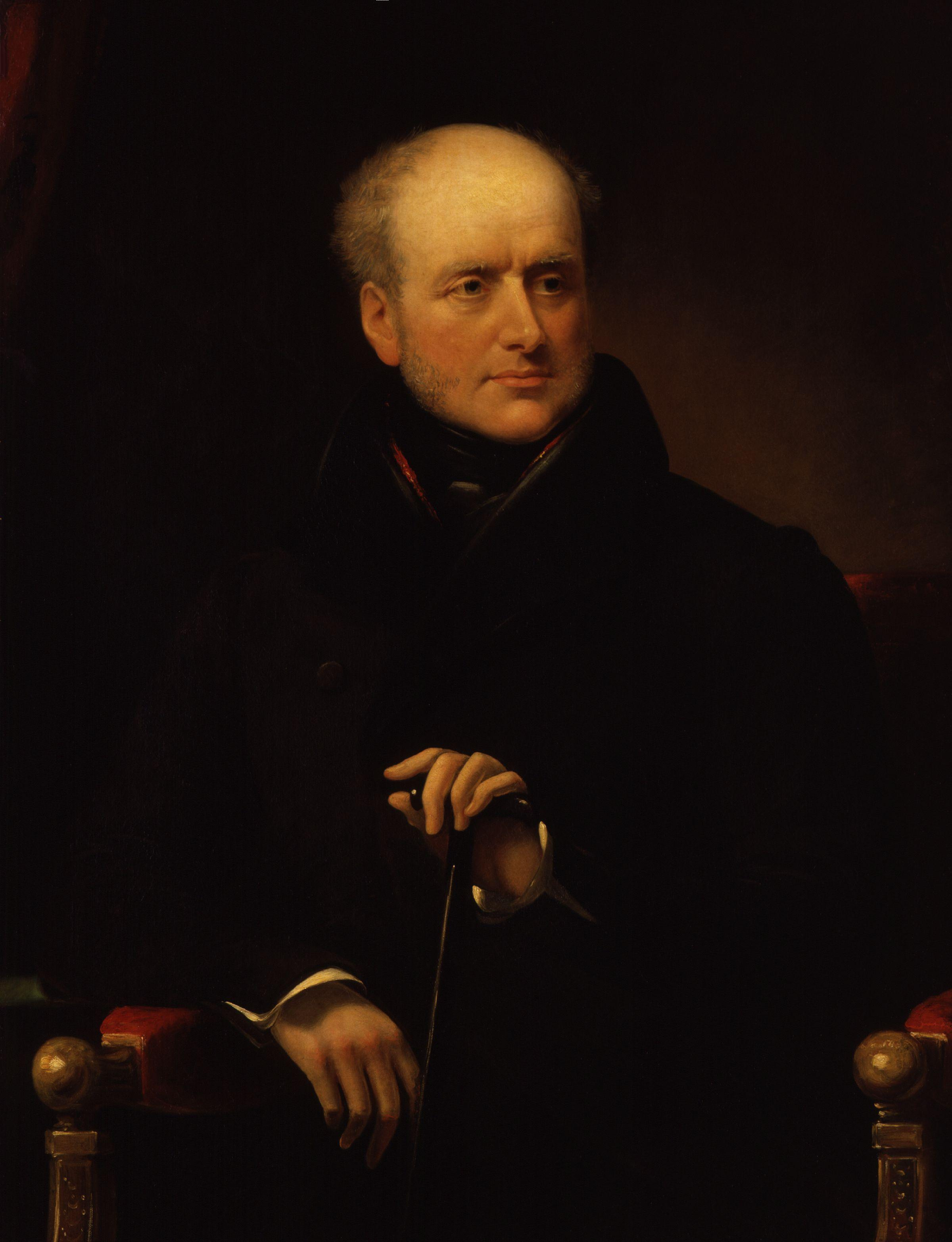
Portrait of James Smith by James Lonsdale, circa 1835

James Smith (10 February 1775 – 24 December 1839) was an English writer. He is best known as co-author of the Rejected Addresses, with his younger brother Horace.

== Life ==
Born in London, he was the second of the eight children of Robert Smith F.R.S., a solicitor, and his wife Mary Bogle; his sister Maria was the mother of Maria Abdy. He received his education at Chigwell School, New College, Hackney, Nicolas Wanostrocht's academy Alfred House in Camberwell, and a commercial school.

Smith entered his father's office and succeeded him as solicitor to the Board of Ordnance in 1812. He died, unmarried, at his house in Craven Street, Strand, London, and was buried in the vaults of St. Martin's-in-the-Fields.

== Rejected Addresses ==
The occasion of this jeu d'esprit was the rebuilding of Drury Lane theatre in 1812, after a fire in which it had been burnt down. The managers had offered a prize of £50 for an address to be recited at the reopening in October. Six weeks before that date it occurred to the brothers Smith to feign that popular poets of the time had been among the competitors; and they issued a volume of unsuccessful addresses in parody of their various styles. James took on William Wordsworth, Robert Southey, Samuel Taylor Coleridge and George Crabbe, while George Gordon Byron, 6th Baron Byron, Thomas Moore, Walter Scott and Bowles were written by Horace.

Seven editions were called for within three months, and none of the poets took offence. Byron and Scott were recorded to have said that they could hardly believe they had not written the addresses ascribed to them.

== Other works ==
The other joint undertaking of the two brothers was Horace in London (1813). James Smith made another hit in writing Country Cousins, A Trip to Paris, A Trip to America, and other skits for Charles Mathews, who said he was "the only man who can write clever nonsense."
