= Brailsford (surname) =

Brailsford is an English surname. Notable people with the surname include:

- Dave Brailsford (born 1963), Welsh bicycle racer turned coach
- H. N. Brailsford (1873–1958), British political journalist
- James Frederick Brailsford (1888–1961), English physician
- Jane Esdon Brailsford (1874–1937), Scottish suffragette
- Jim Brailsford (1933–2015), British cricket player
- John Brailsford the elder (fl. 1712–1739) English cleric and poet
- John Brailsford the younger (died 1775), English cleric, headmaster and author
- Kenneth E. Brailsford (contemporary), American entrepreneur, investor and philanthropist
- Matthew Brailsford (1660–1733), Dean of Wells
- Neil Brailsford, Lord Brailsford (born 1954), Scottish Senator of the College of Justice and Supreme Court Judge
- Parker Brailsford (born 2003), American football player
- Pauline Brailsford (born 1928), English actor
- Sally Brailsford (born 1951), British professor of management science
- Simon Brailsford (contemporary), British RAF officer; equerry to the Queen 1998–2001
- Tim Brailsford (contemporary), Vice Chancellor and President of Bond University

== See also ==
- Brailsford (given name)
