= John Brailsford =

John Brailsford may refer to:

- John Brailsford the elder (1692–1765), English poet
- John Brailsford the younger (died 1775), English poet, son of the above
