= Marie Connor =

English author (1867–1941)

- Born: 4 February 1867; 7 York Road, Bristol, Gloucestershire, England
- Died: 28 January 1941 (aged 73); Aylesbury, Buckinghamshire, England
- Other names: Mrs Leighton, Marie Connor Leighton
- Occupation: Author
- Years active: –
- Known for: Melodramatic novels
- Notable work: Convict 99

Marie Connor Leighton (4 February 1867 – 28 January 1941) was a prolific author of serial fiction and melodramatic novels. She married fellow writer Robert Leighton and her most famous work Convict 99 was written jointly with him. However her writing income was far in excess of his.

== Paternity and birth ==
While most sources describe Connor as the daughter of James Nenon Alexander Connor (1835 – 21 June 1897) this is not accurate as Marie's mother Elizabeth Ann Treglown (Note: Sometimes written as Treglowan or even Trelawny or Trelawney.) (c. 1842 – 16 April 1908) (Note: Elizabeth Ann Treglowan's birth date is uncertain as her implied year of birth differs between census returns.) had a different husband when Connor was born and only married James Nenon Alexander Connor in the first quarter of 1869, when Marie Connor was already two years old.

While Elizabeth Anne Treglown was living at Camborne, Cornwall, with her parents, Josiah Henry Harris (c. 1848 – 18 April 1917), a newspaper reporter, visited her and courted her. He was accepted as her fiancé by her family and the couple had been engaged for some time. In April 1865, the pair travelled to Paris, and were married there, on 6 April 1865, at the English Episcopal Church, in the presence of the British Ambassador. The marriage had been a surprise to the family, and Harris had announced it by letter.

The new couple returned to England, and lived with Elizabeth's parents in Camborne, but after a week, Harris walked out, without saying where he was going. Elizabeth found that he had gone to Bristol and joined him there, but after a time, he again left, this time for Torquay. She joined him in Torquay, but after a time, he again deserted her. By now, her family had moved to Montpelier in Bristol, where Elizabeth gave birth to her daughter at 7 York Road, on 4 February 1867, initially registered as Martha Annie, but later known as Marie. (Note: Any) Elizabeth registered the birth at Clifton on 13 February 1867. Elizabeth was running a school in Montpelier with her sisters Mary Ann (c. 1851 August 1913)and Ellen (c. 1845 – ) while living with her mother.

Josiah seemed fond of the child, caressed it, and treated it as his own. However, after Josiah had again failed in his promises of support for his wife and child, they entered the Workhouse at Clifton, Bristol, on 30 April 1867. The parish authorities, who were responsible for the Workhouse, sought a warrant to arrest Harris for failing to support his wife. Josiah was arrested at Merthyr in South Wales where he worked for The Merthyr Telegraph. He was tried on 9 May 1867 at Bristol Police Court.

Josiah's defence was that he was not liable for maintenance as the couple were not legally married. There was some discussion of this, and the court held, that until a superior court determined that there was no marriage, Josiah was liable. Josiah met with the parish authorities and came to an agreement to pay maintenance. The case was suspended for a month to ensure that he followed through on this promise. It was understood that proceedings to set aside the marriage would be taken in another court. (Note: It is not clear is any further action was taken to put aside the marriage, or to determine its legality. The 1911 census return shows that Josiah married again (c.1874). He wrote about the founder of Sunday schools, about the West Country and at least eleven works of fiction, which Kemp and Mitchell call "undistinguished and amateurish". Josiah took his own life in 1917.)

In the first quarter of 1869, Elizabeth married widower James Nenon Connor in Kensington.. James was a widower, his first wife Eziza Jones (c. 1828 – May 1864) had died five years earlier. Elizabeth described herself as a widow on the marriage certificate. They had one child themselves, Valentine Alexander Nenon Connor (5 June 1875 – 10 May 1927), who emigrated to Canada and worked an engineer there before dying of stomach cancer and pneumonia in Toronto.

== Early life ==
Her step-father had sold his commission in the 87th (Royal Irish Fusiliers) Regiment of Foot and so lost his pension, to that the family lived a hand to mouth existence, living the high life when in funds and hiding out in a small house in St John's Wood when creditors became too insistent.

Clare Leighton's biography of Connor states that Connor had a strange upbringing. Neither her mother or father had much interest in her and she was left to her own devices. She copied an entire novel by hand and sent it to a London publisher, who recognised it, and was so puzzled by the childish handwriting that he visited to find out who was responsible. Her next project was writing names at random from a street directory and sending anonymous letters, warning the recipients that their wives or husbands were being unfaithful with people whose names and addresses she had also picked at random.

Clare Leighton also related what Connor told her children about her first love affair. When she was ten, Connor fell in love with a window-cleaner, a married father of eight. Their correspondence was discovered and the window cleaner threatened with the law. Connor's parents packed her off to a convent in France where she fell in love with the Mother Superior and the Priest and became a devout Catholic for the rest of her life.

After returning from France, Connor got stage-struck, falling in love with the actor Wilson Barrett (1846–1904), and writing poems inspired by him. Her parents decided that the only cure was to give her a taste of the stage, so she went on tour with Barrett, chaperoned by one of her maternal aunts. The experience cured her of her love of the theatre.

== Early writing ==
Connor published her first novel Beauty's Queen, a three-volume melodrama, in 1884 when she was 17.The Graphic, after noting that the novel "contains some very remarkable incidents indeed" concluded by saying "The novel is tragical to the highest pitch. All the characters of any consequence are left dead except one little boy, who, it is cordially to be hoped, grows up to meet with more ordinary experiences. The story is altogether ridiculously impossible, and is told in a style of sentimental exaggeration to which no description can do any sort of justice." Sutherland calls this book "An extraordinary mishmash of romantic and religious passion" and said that "it provoked most reviewers to sarcastic drollery", but that "women readers liked it."

== Marriage and children ==
Connor quickly followed up with another and had published five novels before her marriage to Robert Leighton (5 June 1858 – 11 May 1934). Born in Scotland but growing up in Liverpool, Leighton moved to London in 1879 and began working for Young Folks magazine as an assistant editor. Leighton was the editor from 1884 to 1885. Connor was a contributor to the magazine. In 1886 Leighton left Little Folks to move to the Bristol Observer, but returned to London in 1887.

Kemp and Mitchell state that the Connor and Leighton eloped to Scotland, but the UK marriage records show that they got married in Marylebone, London in the first quarter of 1889. It is clear that they did elope. Connor's mother traced her to a hotel in Fleet Street, and was only placated when the couple were able to show her their marriage certificate.

The family lived at 'Vallombrosa' at 40 Abbey Road, St John's Wood, London, where they led a chaotic bohemian existence. Every summer they migrated to a turreted seaside cliff-top villa at Lowestoft in Suffolk.

Connor and her husband had four children:

- Their first child was accidentally smothered in infancy by a nurse.
- Roland Aubrey Leighton (27 March 1895 – 23 December 1915), a poet who was killed in the First World War. He was Vera Brittain's fiancé and features largely in Testament of Youth, the first instalment of her memoirs. He was his mother's favourite. "He is the only one of my children who is beautiful enough to be worth dressing" her daughter reports her as saying. His mother's love for him "stopped just short of idolatry". Marie was devastated when Roland was killed and published an anonymous memoir of him as Boy of My Heart in 1916. The inscription chosen by the family for Roland's headstone reads: "GOODNIGHT, THOUGH LIFE AND ALL TAKE FLIGHT, NEVER GOOD-BYE."
- Clare Leighton (Note: Baptised Clare Marie Veronica Leighton on 26 May 1898, she was also known as Clare Ellaline Hope Leighton and Clare Veronica Hope Leighton) (12 April 1898 – 4 November 1989), a writer and artist. She wrote several novels as well as the biography of her mother, and was a noted wood engraver. Connor had been dismissive of Clare's looks, ambitions and talents.
- Evelyn Ivor Robert Leighton (31 May 1901 – 21 October 1969) was destined from boyhood for the Navy. He joined the navy on 15 January 1915, and remained in the Navy after the Great War, being posted to the Royal Australian Navy for a while, and marrying an English bride while he was there.

== Works ==
The following is a list, principally drawn from the Jisc Library Hub Discover collated catalogue. (Note: Library Hub Discover is a database collating 161 UK and Irish academic, national & specialist library catalogues.) One title not listed on the Jisc catalogues was found in the list of titles on Holland's blog about Connor. The notes indicate if and where online copies of the texts can be found.

Books by Marie Connor
No	Year	Title	Publisher	Pages	Notes
1	1884	Beauty's Queen. A romance, etc	F. V. White & Co., London	3 vols., 8º	(Note: Online at The British Library in three Volumes: Vol.1, Vol.2, Vol.3.)
2	1885	A morganatic marriage	F. V. White & Co., London	3 vols., 8º	(Note: Online at The British Library in three Volumes: Vol.1, Vol.2, Vol.3.)
3	1886	Two Black Pearls. A novel	F. V. White & Co., London	190 p., 8º	
4	1887	Sweet Magdalen. Only a love story, etc	F. V. White & Co., London	3 vols., 8º	(Note: Online at The British Library in three Volumes: Vol.1, Vol.2, Vol.3.)
5	1888	Husband and Wife. A novel, etc	F. V. White & Co., London	3 vols., 8º	(Note: Online at The British Library in three Volumes: Vol.1, Vol.2, Vol.3.)
6	1889	The Triumph of Manhood	Chapman & Hall, London	3 vols., 8º	FRv (Note: Online at The British Library in three Volumes: Vol.1, Vol.2, Vol.3.)
7	1891	The Lady of Balmerino. A romance of the Grampians, etc	Ward Lock & Co, London	3 vol., 8º.	(Note: Online at The British Library in three Volumes: Vol.1, Vol.2, Vol.3.)
8	1893	The Heart's Awakening. A novel	Chapman & Hall, London	3 vols., 8º	(Note: Online at The British Library in three Volumes: Vol.1, Vol.2, Vol.3.)
9	1897	The Red-Painted Box. Being the narrative of a curious experience in the life of the Reverend Mark Bessemer	John Macqueen, London	v. 238 p., 8º	(Note: Online at The British Library)
10	1898	Convict 99 : a true story of penal servitude	Grant Richards, London	vi, 316 p., 8 fp ill., 19 cm.	(Note: Written with Robert Leighton. Eight full page illustrations by Stanley L. Wood. Online at The British Library and HathiTrust.)
11	1898	The harvest of sin	James Bowder, London	126 p., 2 ill., 22 cm.	
12	1899	Michael Dred, detective: the unravelling of a mystery of twenty years	Grant Richards, London	328 p., 8 ill., 8º	(Note: Not in the Jisc catalogues. Written with Robert Leighton. Said to be the first story in which the detective turns out to be the murderer. Eight Illustrations.)
13	1900	A Napoleon of the press	Hodder & Stoughton, London	viii, 312 p., 23 cm.	(Note: A novel featuring Lord Northcliffe (1865–1922) for whom Connor and her Husband did most of their work.)
14	1901	In the Shadow of Guilt. A novel	Grant Richards, London	vi. 407 p., 8º	(Note: Written with Robert Leighton. With illustrations by F. C. Luckhurst. Reissued as a Daily Mail sixpenny novel. The British Library Catalogue entry suggests that the sixpenny novel may have been illustrated by G. H. Evison.)
15	1903	In God's Good Time	Grant Richards, London	viii. 510 p., 8º	
16	1904	The Amazing Verdict	Grant Richards, London	468 p., 8º	
17	1906	Sealed Lips	Ward Lock & Co, London	368 p., 8º	(Note: With illustrations by Harold Piffard)
18	1907	Her Ladyship's Silence	Cassell's, London	vii. 371 p., 8º	(Note: With four illustrations.)
19	1908	Put Yourself in Her Place	Ward Lock & Co, London	347 p., 8º	(Note: Illustrated)
20	1909	“Money.”	Ward Lock & Co, London	383 p., 8º	
21	1909	An Eye for an Eye	Ward Lock & Co, London	378 p., 8º	
22	1909	Deep waters	Ward Lock & Co, London	414 p., 1 ill., 20 cm.	
23	1910	Convict 413 L	Ward Lock & Co, London	319 p., 8º	
24	1910	Joan Mar, Detective	Ward Lock & Co, London	306 p., 8º	
25	1910	Justice!	Ward Lock & Co, London	303, 16 p., 1 ill., 20 cm.	
26	1911	Builders of Ships	Ward Lock & Co, London	304 p., 8º	
27	1911	Greed	Ward Lock & Co, London	320 p., 8º	
28	1911	The Bride of Dutton Market	Ward Lock & Co, London	320 p., 8º	
29	1912	Her marriage lines	Ward Lock & Co, London	320 p., col. fs, 8º.	
30	1912	The Missing Miss Randolph	Ward Lock & Co, London	309 p., 8º	
31	1912	The Triangle	Ward Lock & Co, London	319 p., 8º	
32	1913	Black Silence	Ward Lock & Co, London	347 p., 8º	
33	1913	Ducks and Drakes	Ward Lock & Co, London	320 p., 8º	
34	1913	Her convict husband	Ward Lock & Co, London	320 p., fs, 8º.	
35	1914	Under the Broad Arrow	Hodder & Stoughton, London	126 p., 8º	(Note: Hodder & Stoughton's famous sixpenny novels No. 378)
36	1914	Geraldine Walton – woman!	Ward Lock & Co, London	319 p., fs, 8º.	
37	1914	The Silver Stair	Ward Lock & Co, London	352 p., 8º	
38	1914	The way of sinners	Ward Lock & Co, London	320 p., fs, 8º.	
39	1915	The Fires of Love	Ward Lock & Co, London	320 p., 8º	
40	1915	The Gates of Sorrow	Ward Lock & Co, London	320 p., 8º	
41	1916	A Marked Woman	Hodder & Stoughton, London	viii, 294 p., 8º	
42	1916	Dark peril	Hodder & Stoughton, London	285 p., 20 cm.	
43	1916	Boy of my heart	Hodder & Stoughton, London	221 p.;	(Note: Non-fiction. Published anonymously. Online at Project Gutenberg and the Internet Archive)
44	1916	In the grip of a lie	John Long, London	320 p., 20 cm.	
45	1916	The Man who knew all	John Long, London	319 p., 8º	
46	1916	The Mystery of the Three Fingers	John Long, London	320 p., 8º	
47	1916	The Story of a Great Sin	Ward Lock & Co, London	318 p., 8º	
48	1916	Human nature	Ward Lock & Co, London	315 p., 1 ill., 19 cm.	
49	1917	The Baked Bread, A Novel	Hodder & Stoughton, London	294 p., 8º	
50	1917	The shame of silence	John Long, London	318 p., 8º.	
51	1917	Every Man has his Price	Ward Lock & Co, London	304 p., 8º	
52	1917	Vengeance is Mine	Ward Lock & Co, London	320 p., 8º	(Note: Online at HathiTrust)
53	1918	Verses of a V. A. D	E. MacDonald Ltd., London	3 p.l., 9-46 p., 18 cm.	(Note: Written by Vera Brittain, with dedication by Connor. Online at Project Gutenberg.)
54	1918	Hidden Hands	George Newnes, London	284 p., 8º	
55	1918	Letters of an expectant grandmother	Hodder & Stoughton, London	xviii, 298, 1 p., 19 cm.	(Note: Non-fiction. Published anonymously.)
56	1918	Guilty or innocent?	Ward Lock & Co, London	300 p., fs, 8º.	
57	1918	The Duchess Grace	Ward Lock & Co, London	303 p., 8º	
58	1918	The hand of the unseen : a romance of real life	Ward Lock & Co, London	317 p., fs, 8º.	
59	1919	Lucile Dare, Detective	Ward Lock & Co, London	320 p., 8º	
60	1919	Red Gold	Ward Lock & Co, London	314 p., 8º	
61	1920	The Girl of the Yellow Diamonds	C. Arthur Pearson Ltd, London	253 p., 8º	
62	1920	The opal heart	Ward Lock & Co, London	pp. 309. 8º.	
63	1920	Convict 100	Ward Lock & Co, London	313 p., (8º)	
64	1921	The Stolen Honeymoon	Odhams Press, London	178 p., 8º	
65	1921	Her fate and his	Ward Lock & Co, London	303 p., 8º.	
66	1921	The Silent Clue	Ward Lock & Co, London	301 p., (8º)	
67	1922	Was she worth it?	Aldine Publishing Co., London	8º	(Note: Mascot Novels. no. 183.)
68	1922	For Love or Money	Ward Lock & Co, London	303 p., 8º	
69	1929	Who Killed Lord Luxmore? etc	C. Arthur Pearson Ltd, London	126 p., 8º	(Note: Written with Robert Leighton.)
70	1930	The Torry diamonds mystery	Pearson, London		(Note: Pearson's 6d novels)
71	1933	The Woman Bars the Way	Gramol Publications, London	8º	(Note: Adelphi Novels. no. 27.)
72	1936	The Money Spider	Mellifont Press, London	160 p., 8º	
73	1937	In the Plotter's Web	Mellifont Press, London	160 p., 8º	
74	1937	The Silence of Dr. Duveen, etc	Mellifont Press, London	160 p., 8º	

== Convict 99 ==
Connor continued to churn out novels after her marriage, writing four in total with Leighton, including her most successful work Convict 99. A true story of penal servitude. Sutherland describes this as: "a powerful anti-prison tract which became their best-known work. It has a highly sensational plot in which the hero, Laurence Gray, is framed by a rival in love on false charges of embezzlement and murder. Sent to Grimley Prison as Convict 99 on a life sentence, Laurence suffers various indignities before escaping and proving his innocence. The force of the book lies in its graphic and credible depictions of life in jail (particularly the part played by corporal punishment, or the ‘cat’)."

The story was published first as a serial in Answers one of the publications produced by Alfred Harmsworth (1865–1922), (Note: Later better known as Lord Northcliffe.) for whom both Connor and Leighton worked. It was published by Grant Richards in London. Quoting Grant Richards, the head of that publishing house, Kemp and Mitchell say that Convict 99 was hugely successful as a serial and was used time and again in different papers, but that it never attract as large a public in book form. Kemp and Mill also say that Convict 99 was Connor's greatest success.

Few of Connor's novels were illustrated, and even those which had any illustration usually only had a front-piece. This was normal for novels intended for adults. However Convict 99, like the first three books jointly written with Leighton, was illustrated. (Note: As a writer of juvenile fiction, Robert Leighton's work was usually illustrated.) The eight illustrations below were made by Stanley L. Wood (1866–1928), and are from the online copy at The British Library.

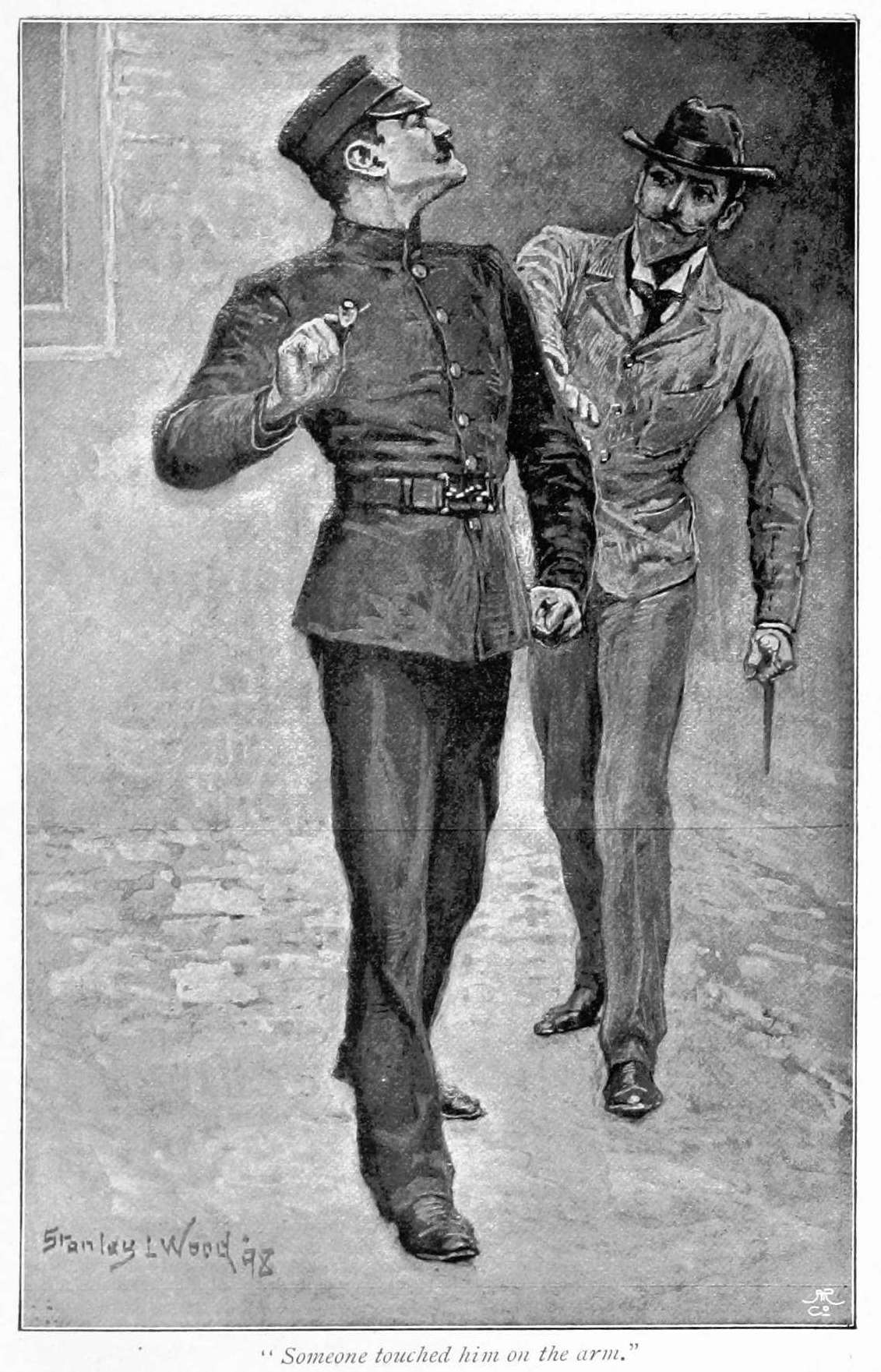
Page 76

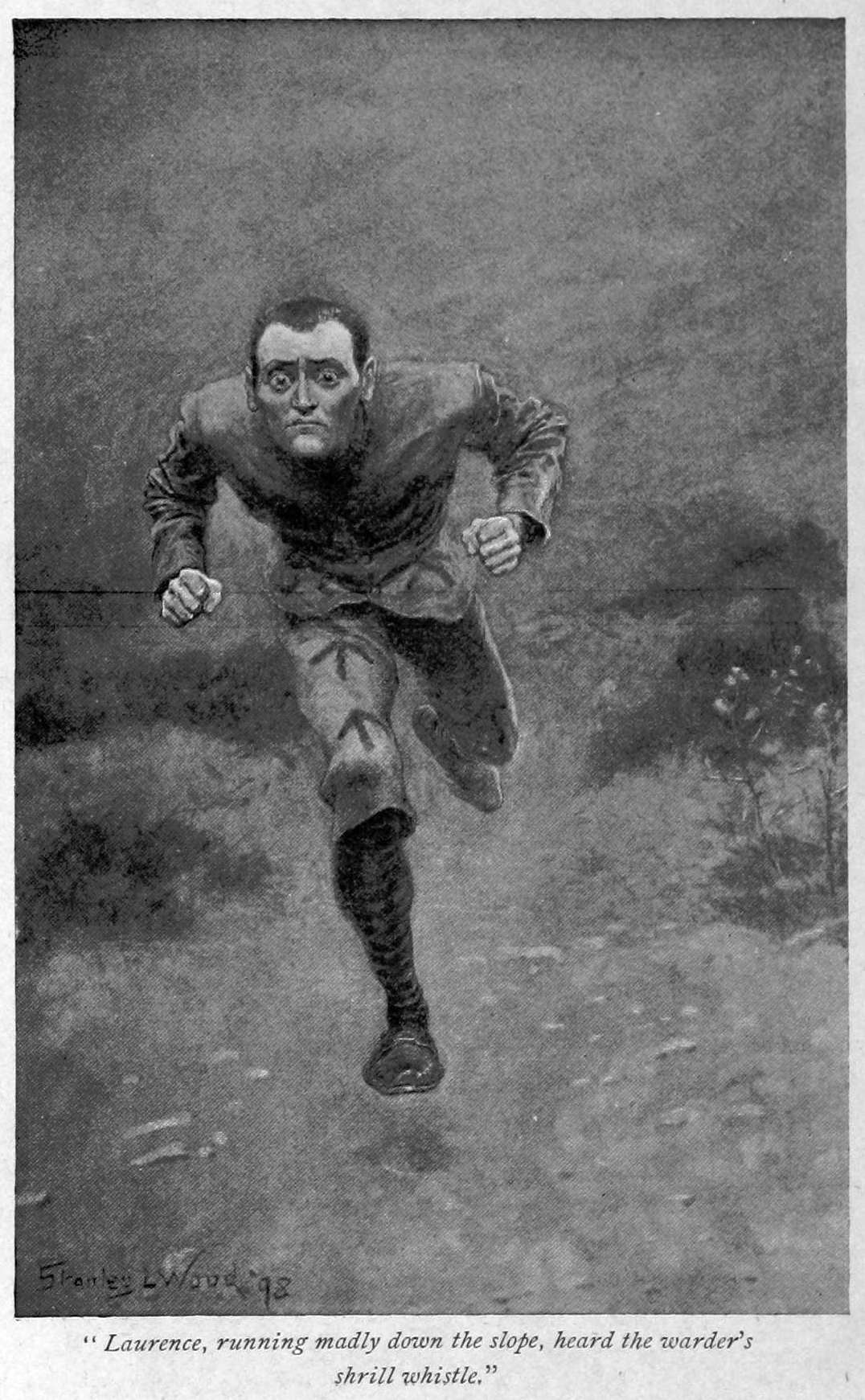
Page 123

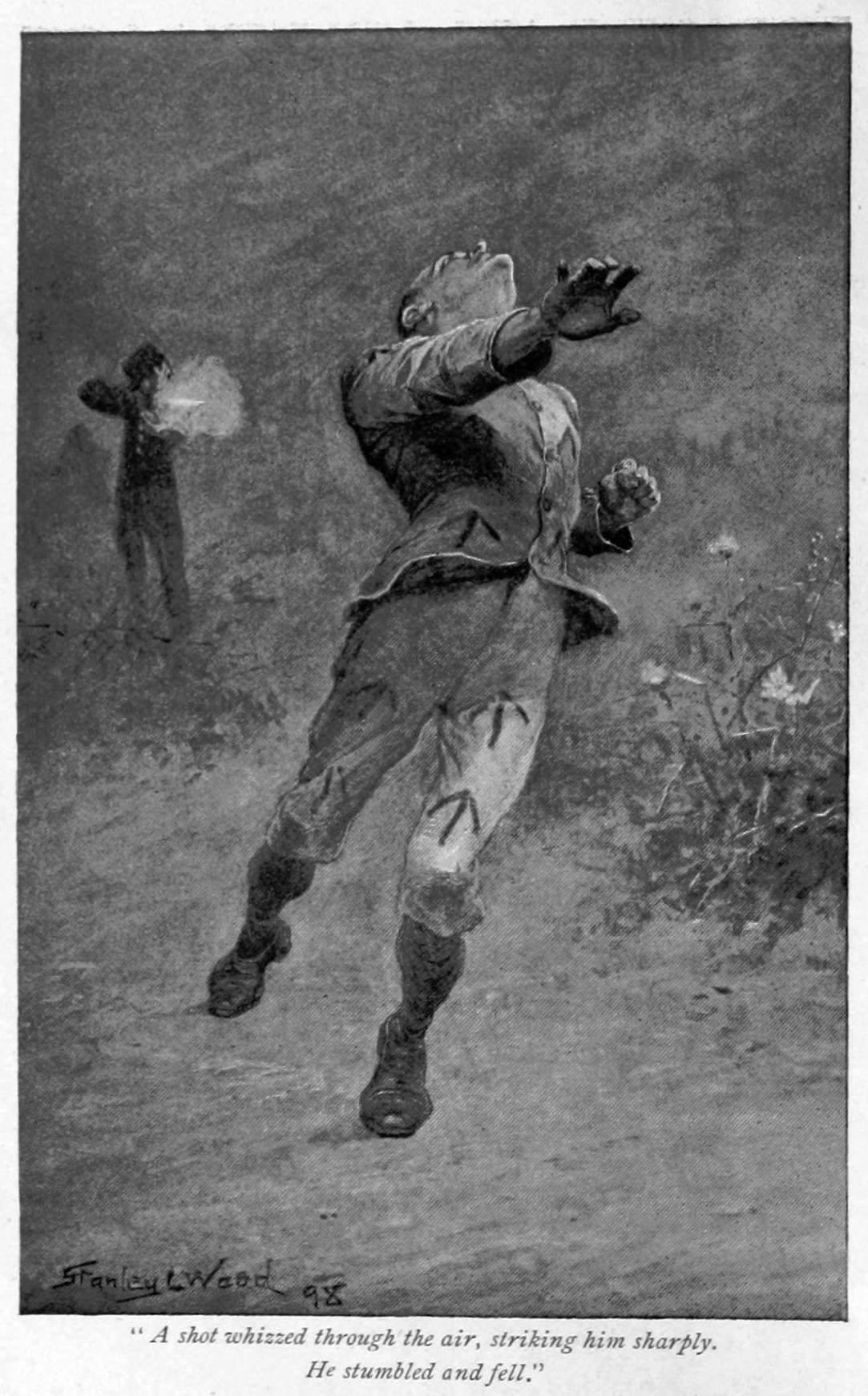
Page 124

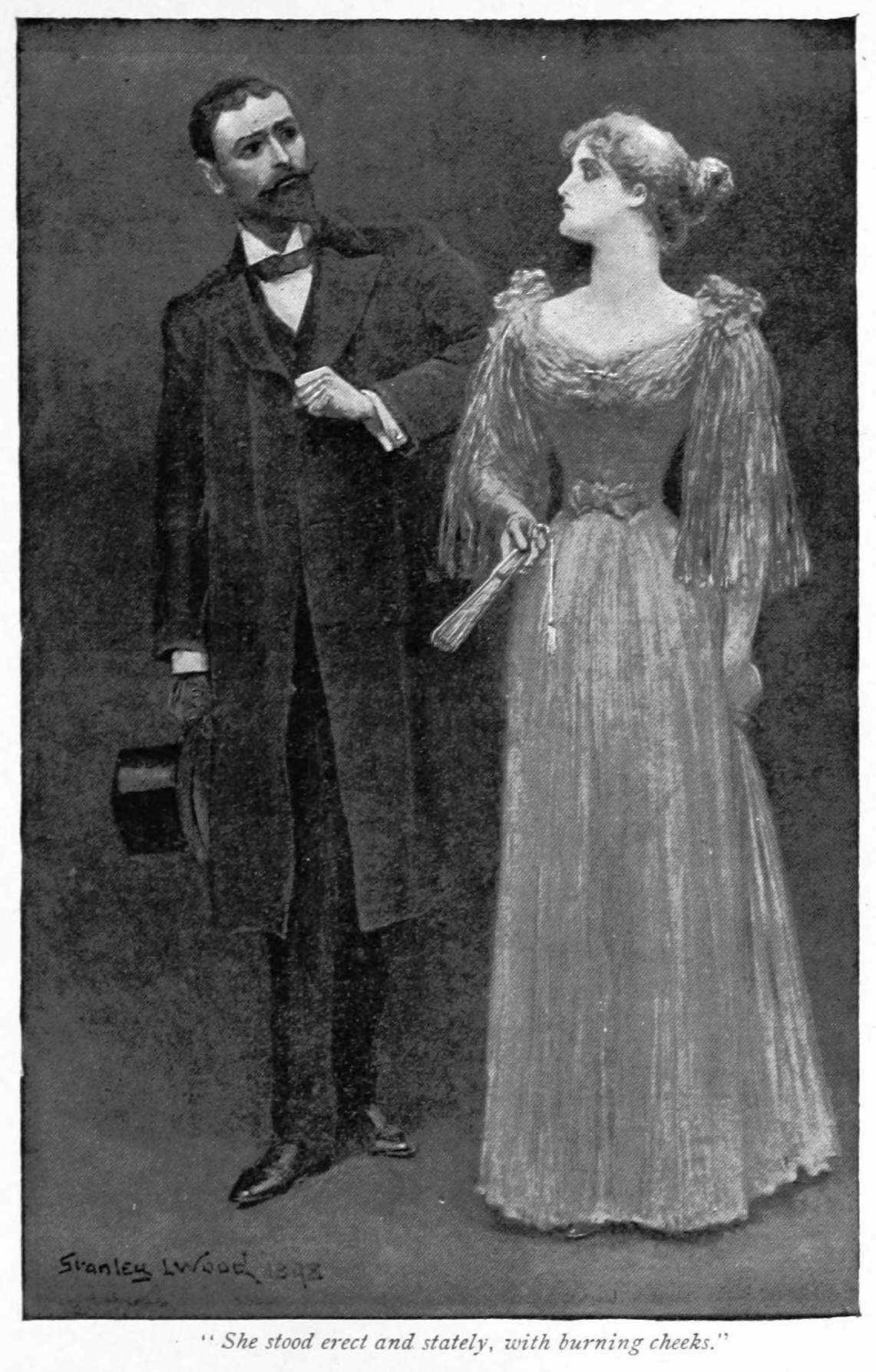
Page 152

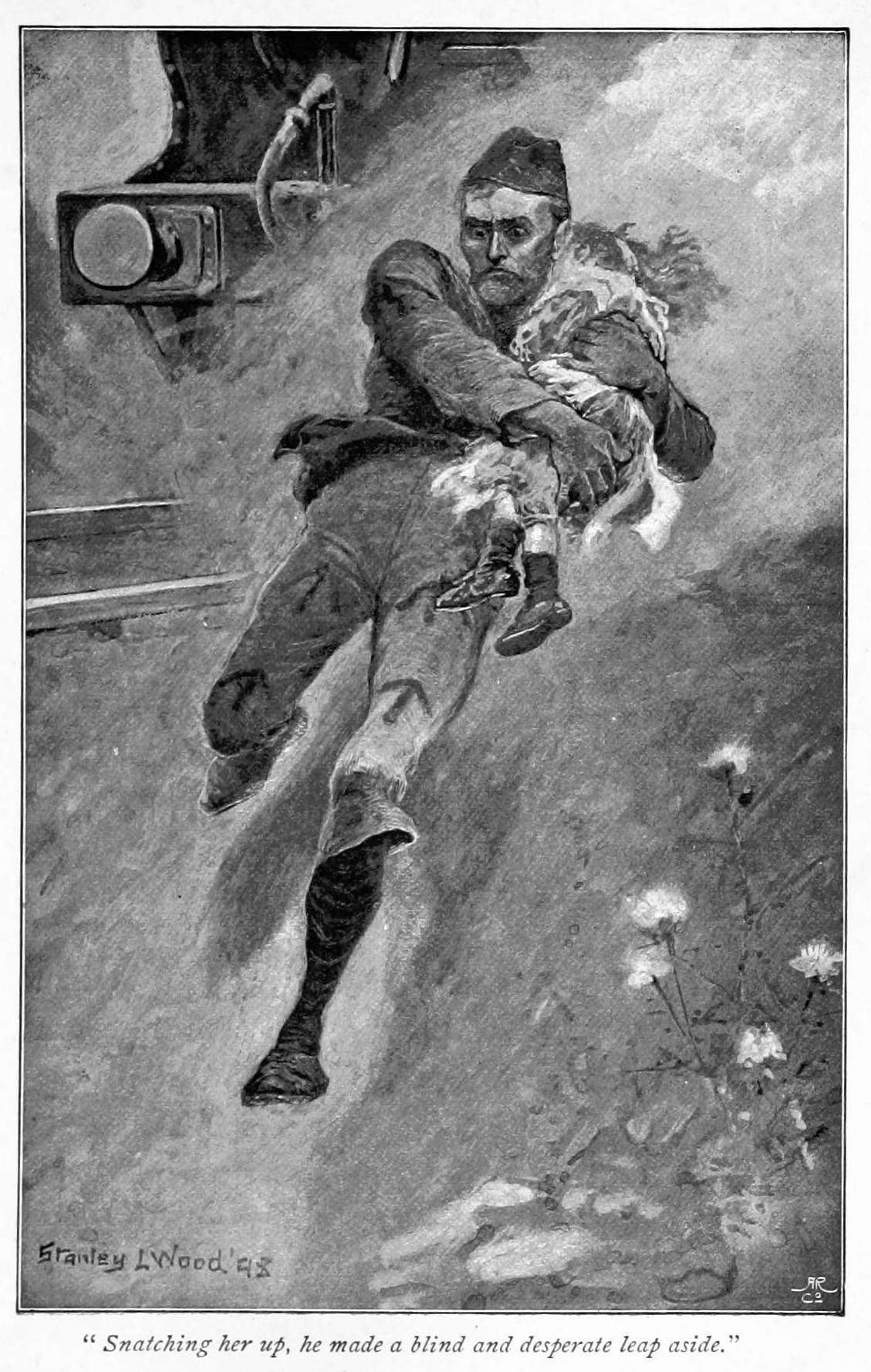
Page 214

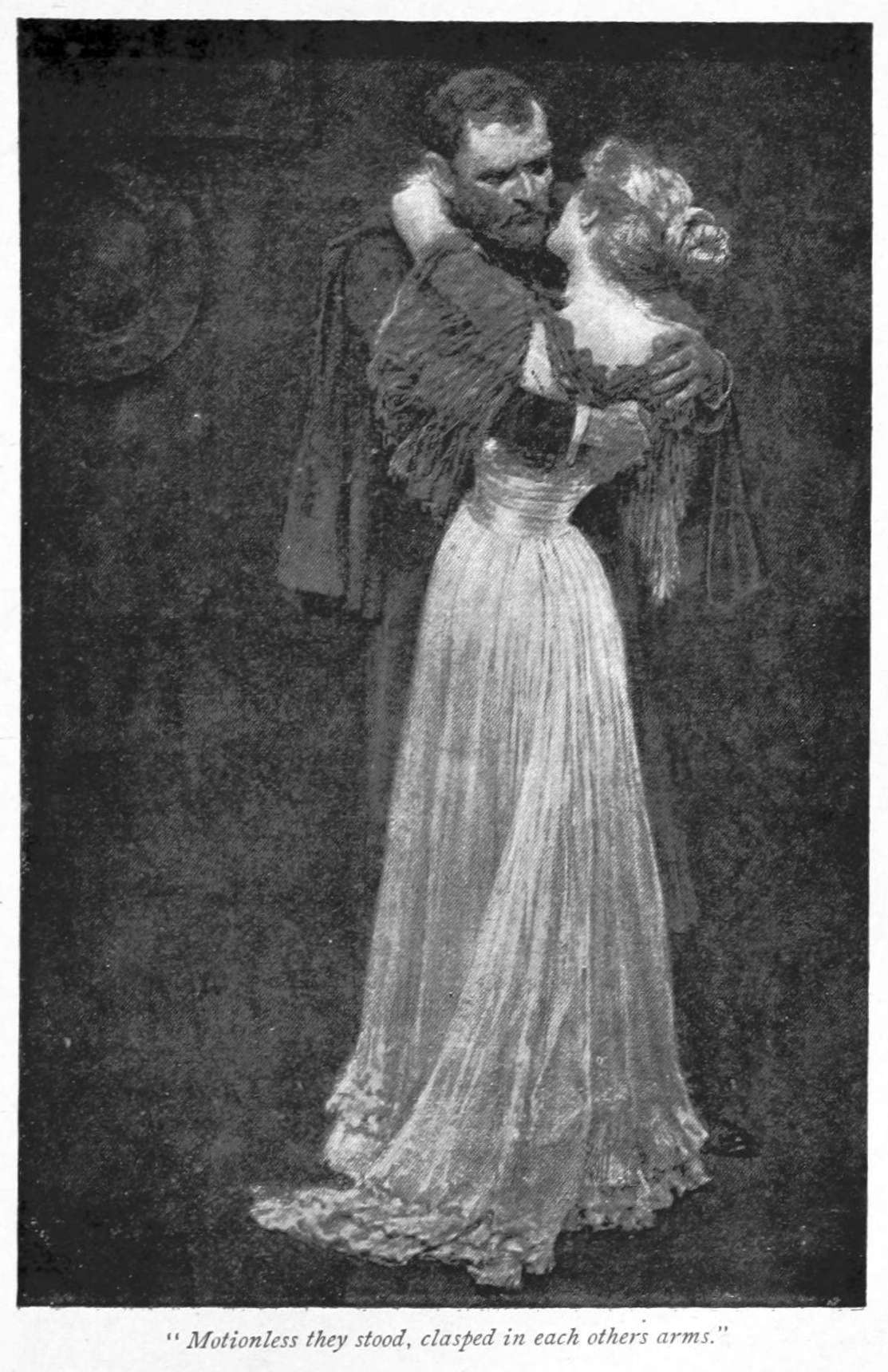
Page 232

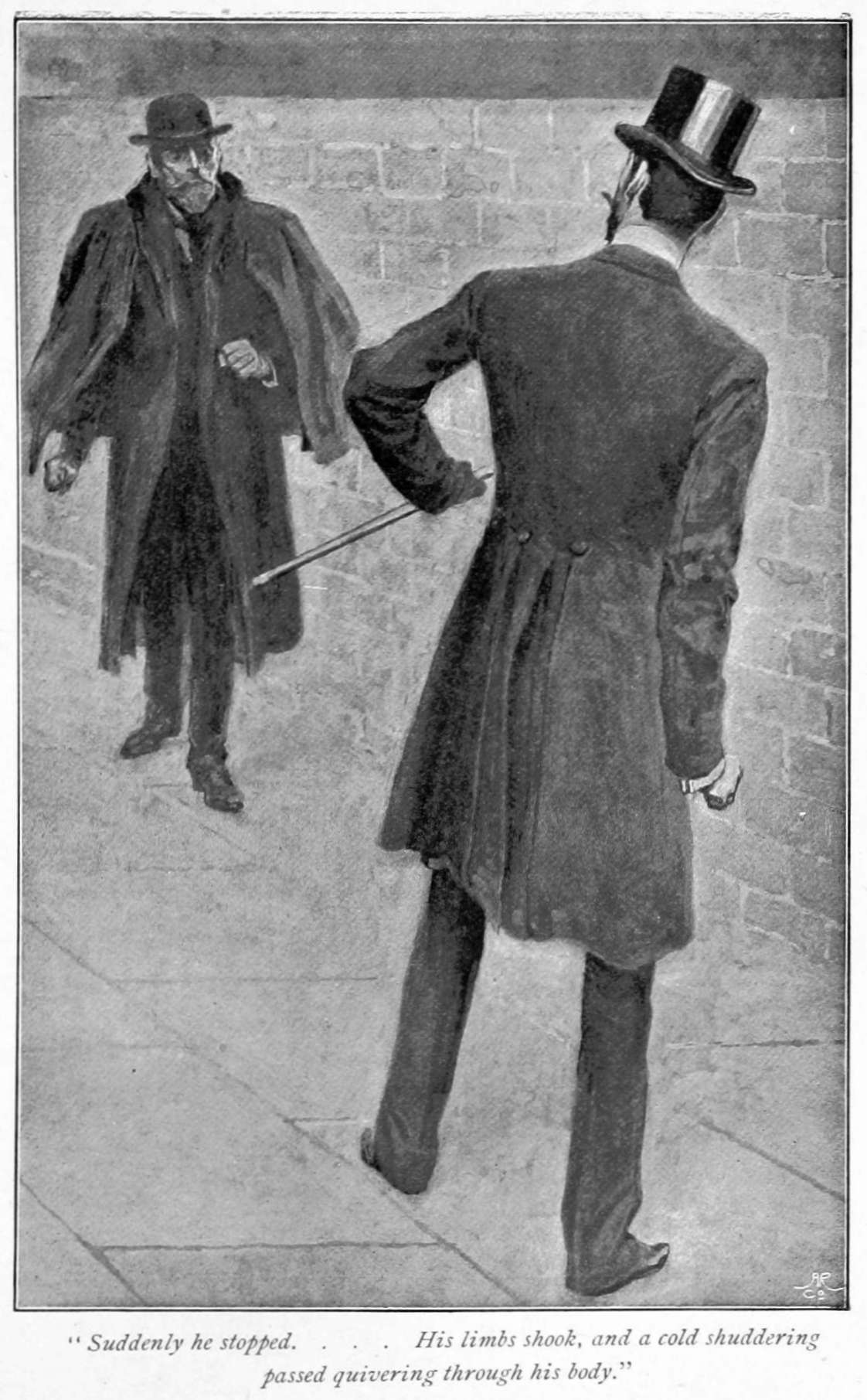
Page 252

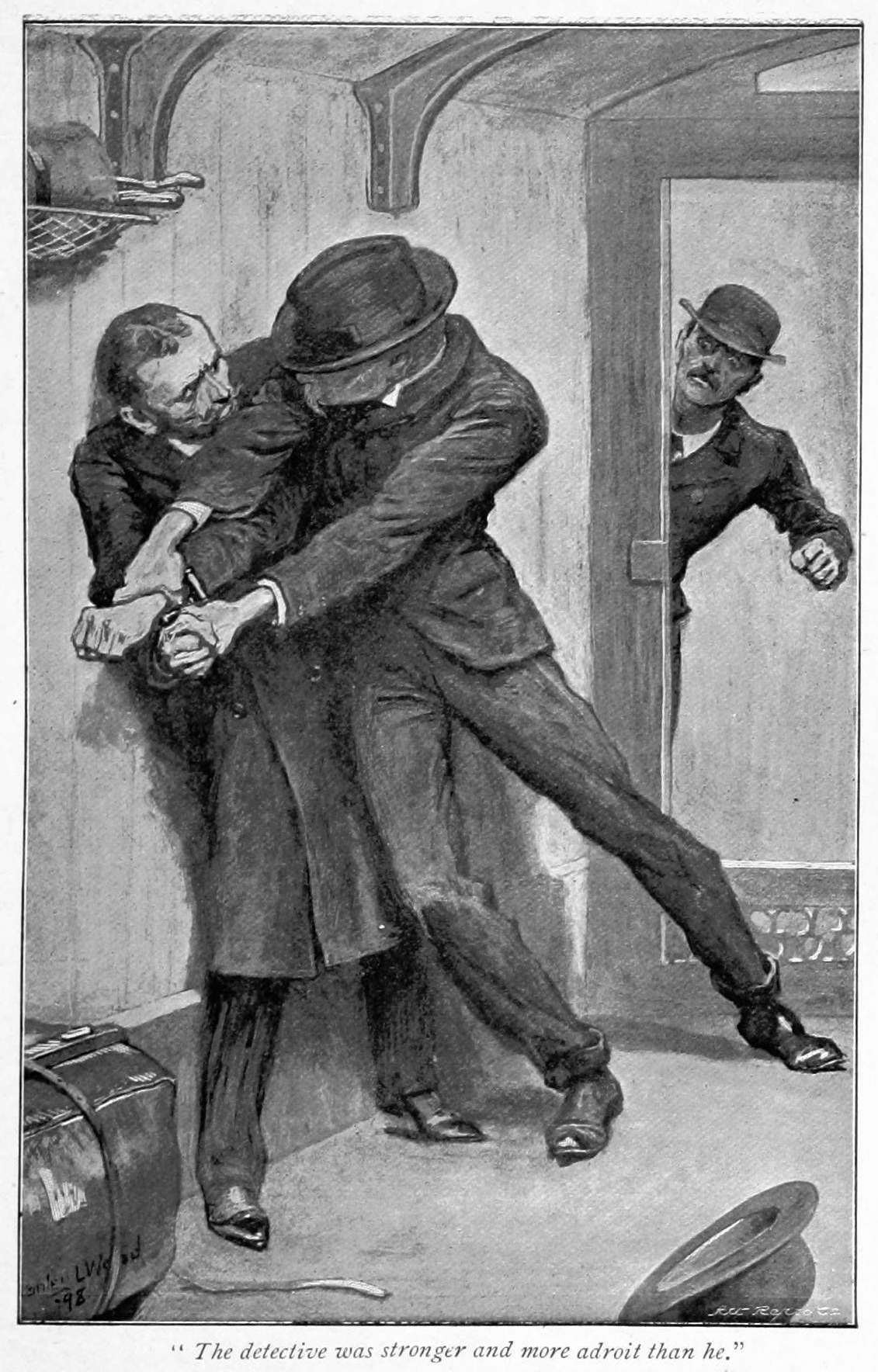
Page 278

== Later life ==
Clare Leighton says of her mother that "all men fell in love with her". During her childhood, she relates, there were three men who, with her father, were in love with her mother. Roland called them "Mother's Old Men".

From 1891 both Connor and Leighton worked for Alfred Harmsworth, he as an editor, and she as a writer of serial fiction. Harmsworth put his editors in their place when she was pregnant, and they were worried about a delayed installment, telling them that Connor would go on just the same even if she were about to give birth to triplets the next day. Many of Connor's stories were, like Convict 99 serialised first in Harmsworth's Answers.

From 1896 Connor and Leighton were writing almost exclusively for Harmsworth's Daily Mail. Connor continued to produce "potboiling crime stories" sometimes include female heroines. The Times said that her stories were "of the crude, rapidly-moving type, that a pre-cinema public read with approval and delight". Connor published her last novel in 1937, but in practical terms she had given up all serious writing in the 1920s.

Connor died in hospital in Aylsbury, on 28 January 1941. Leighton had died seven years earlier. Mark Bostridge says that Connor "was the archetypal romantic novelist", that she was eccentric and larger than life. Perhaps the best summary comes from the sub-title of her daughter's biography, Connor was an invincible Edwardian.
