= Clare Leighton =

English-born American artist

- Born: Clare Marie Veronica Leighton; 12 April 1898; London, England, United Kingdom
- Died: 4 November 1989 (aged 91)
- Resting place: Waterbury, Connecticut, United States
- Education: Brighton College of Art, Slade School of Fine Art, Central School of Arts and Crafts
- Known for: Wood engravings

Clare Marie Veronica Leighton, sometimes Clara Ellaline Hope Leighton or Clare Veronica Hope Leighton, (12 April 1898 – 4 November 1989) was an English–American artist, writer and illustrator, best known for her wood engravings.

== Early life and education ==
Clare Leighton was born in London on 12 April 1898, the daughter of Robert Leighton (1858–1934) and Marie Connor Leighton (1867–1941), both authors. She was baptised with the name Clare Marie Veronica Leighton on 26 May 1898 at All Saints' Church in St John's Wood. Clare lived her early life in the shadow of her elder brother, Roland – her mother's favourite; the family nickname for Clare was "the bystander". Her mother was dismissive of Clare's looks, ambitions and talents, while she said of Roland that: "He is the only one of my children who is beautiful enough to be worth dressing". Nevertheless, Clare's 1947 biography of her mother Tempestuous Petticoat: the story of an Invincible Edwardian succeeded in "making her readers envy this fantastic mother, even share some of the affection which she feels for her".

Her early efforts at painting were encouraged by her father and her uncle Jack Leighton, an artist and illustrator. Clare and her uncle made several sketching trips together to mainland Europe. In 1915, Leighton began formal studies at the Brighton College of Art and later trained at the Slade School of Fine Art (1921–1923) and the Central School of Arts and Crafts, where she studied wood engraving under Noel Rooke.

After completing her studies, Leighton took time to travel through Europe, stopping in Italy, France and the Balkans. She sketched landscapes and peasant workers, developing an affinity for portraying rural life.

== Career ==
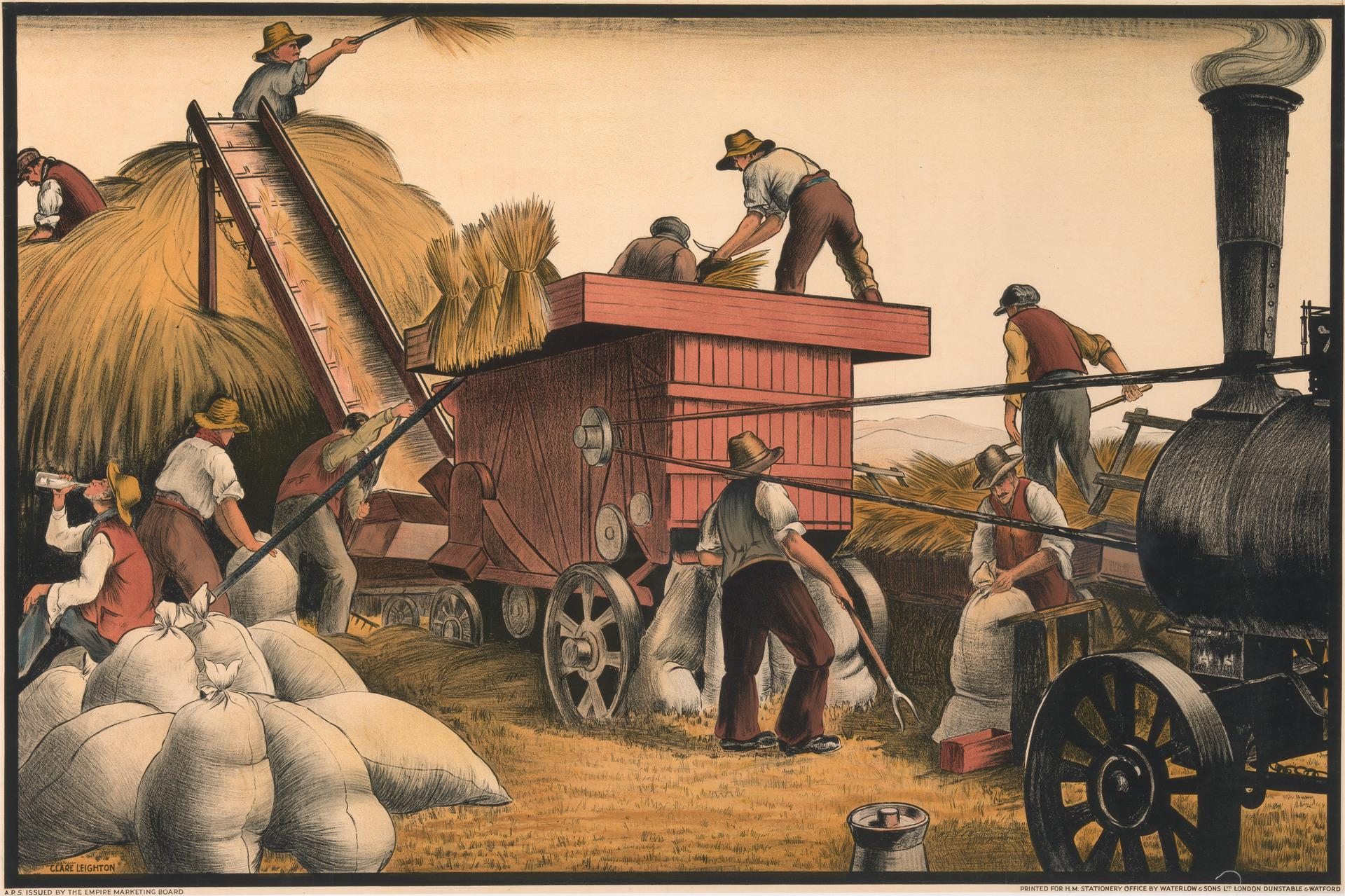
Clare Leighton "Harvest" (between 1926 and 1933), a lithograph in the Yale Center for British Art

During the late 1920s and 1930s, Leighton visited the United States on a number of lecture tours, emigrating to the US in 1939. In 1930, the Art Institute of Chicago awarded her with the Mr. And Mrs. Frank G. Logan First Prize ($100). She lived in Baltimore for a while and became friends with H. L. Mencken. Leighton became a naturalised citizen in 1945. From 1943 to 1945 she was a member of the Department of Art, Aesthetics, and Music at Duke University. In 1945 she was elected into the National Academy of Design as an Associate member and became a full Academician in 1949.

Over the course of a long and prolific career, Leighton wrote and illustrated numerous books praising the virtues of the countryside and the people who worked the land. In 1932, she was the first woman to produce a book on wood-engraving, Wood-Engraving and Woodcuts. This played an important part in popularizing the medium. During the 1920s and 1930s, as the world around her became increasingly technological, industrial and urban, Leighton continued to paint rural working men and women. These included a 1938 poster design for London Transport promoting weekend walks in the countryside. In the 1950s she created designs for Steuben Glass, Wedgwood plates, several stained-glass windows for churches in New England and for the transept windows of the Cathedral of Saint Paul (Worcester, Massachusetts).

The best known of her books are The Farmer's Year (1933; a calendar of English husbandry), Four Hedges – A Gardener's Chronicle (1935; the development of a garden from a meadow she had bought in the Chilterns) and Tempestuous Petticoat; The story of an Invincible Edwardian (1948; describing her childhood and her bohemian mother). Autobiographical text and illustrations are available in Clare Leighton: The growth and shaping of an artist-writer, published in 2009. One of her most notable illustrative endeavors was creating 16 woodcuts for Thornton Wilder's illustrated edition of The Bridge of San Luis Rey (Longmans, Green and Company 1929). Examples of her work were included in 'Print and Prejudice: Women Printmakers, 1700-1930', an exhibition at the Victoria and Albert Museum in London during 2022 and 2023. Three of Leighton's woodcuts for H. R. Williamson's The Flowering Hawthorn (1962) were selected by Adam Stout to illustrate his 2020 book on the Glastonbury Thorn.

Several of Leighton's prints were included in the 2025 Clark Art Institute's exhibition A Room of Her Own: Women Artists-Activists in Britain, 1875-1945.

== Personal life ==
Leighton had two brothers: the elder, Roland Leighton, was killed in action in December 1915, and is immortalised in Vera Brittain's memoir, Testament of Youth; the younger Evelyn, a Royal Navy officer, received the OBE in 1942.

Leighton met the radical journalist H. N. Brailsford in 1928, and they lived together for several years. He was separated from Jane Esdon Brailsford who refused him a divorce. When Brailsford's wife died in 1937, leaving the way clear for the couple to marry, he suffered an emotional breakdown, destroying his relationship with Leighton who left for a new life in the US in 1939. She never married.

Leighton died 4 November 1989. Her ashes are buried in a cemetery in Waterbury, Connecticut.
