= Brailsford (given name) =

Brailsford is a given name. Notable people with the name include:

- Charles Brailsford Edwards (1906–1983), Canadian journalist and news agency executive
- James Brailsford Erwin (1856−1924), United States Army general
- Thorburn Brailsford Robertson (1884–1930), Australian physiologist, biochemist, gerontologist and animal nutritionist

== See also ==
- Brailsford (surname)
