= Robert Leighton (author) =

Writer of Boy's Adventure Stories, Editor, and Journalist

- Born: 5 June 1858; Ayr, Ayrshire, Scotland
- Died: 11 May 1934 (aged 75); Bishop's Stortford, Hertfordshire, England
- Occupations: Author; journalist; editor
- Years active: 1880–1922
- Known for: Writing adventure books for boys
- Notable work: The Complete Book of the Dog

Robert Leighton (5 June 1858 – 11 May 1934) was a Scottish journalist, editor, and writer of boys' fiction. He was an editor of juvenile magazines, and through his work at Young Folks he met his future wife Marie Connor, a prolific author in her own right. Leighton became an expert on dogs and their care and produced many works on this topic.

== Early life ==
Leighton was born in the town of Ayr in Scotland on 5 June 1858 to Robert Leighton, a Scottish poet (20 February 1822 – 10 May 1869), and Elizabeth Jane Campbell (1820–1914). Some sources, such as the British Library give his year of birth as 1859. Others, including Sutherland, give it at 1858. However, his father only worked in Ayr from 1854 to 1858 for a Liverpool seed merchant, and the only male Leighton born in the District of Ayr from 1854 to 1864 was an unnamed son to Leighton's parents on 5 June 1858.

In the 1861 Census, Leighton was living in Liverpool, where his father was employed by a seed and agricultural supplies merchant. He was educated in the school attached to the Hope Street Unitarian Chapel in Liverpool. He began work as a journalist at age 14, working first for the Liverpool Porcupine, a social and satirical journal.

== Moving to London ==
Leighton moved to London in 1879 and began working for Young Folks magazine as an assistant editor. Young Folks accepted Treasure Island from Robert Louis Stevenson and ran it as a serial from 1881 to 1882 while he was first assistant editor. Young Folks also serialised The Black Arrow in June – October 1883. Leighton was the editor from 1884 to 1885.

While he was at Young Folks, he met the tempestuous Marie Connor (Note: Marie's daughter Clare wrote a biography of her mother entitled Tempestuous Petticoat. In this she describes how her mother told her children that she had her first love affair, with a married father of eight children, a window-cleaner, when she was ten years of age (p.39). Her parents packed her off to a convent in France where she fell in love with the Mother Superior and the Priest and became a devout Catholic.) (February 1866 – 28 January 1941), the adopted daughter of James Nenon Alexander Connor, formerly a captain in the 87th Foot, and the daughter of Elizabeth Ann Harris (1849 – 16 April 1908), a widow, born Trelawny. (Note: Originally spelt Treglown.) Connor, who contributed to the magazine, published her first novel Beauty's Queen, a three-volume melodrama, in 1884 when she was 18. In 1886 Leighton left Little Folks to move to the Bristol Observer, but returned to London in 1887.

In London, he eventually found work with the Harmsworths, and was a director of their Answers Ltd company from 1893 to 1896.

== Marriage and family ==
In 1889, Leighton eloped with Marie Connor; they were married at Marylebone in the first quarter of 1889. Marie was an established novelist at this stage, publishing her sixth book in the year of her marriage.

Leighton began to produce books himself, starting with The Pilots of Pomona in 1892, but throughout the marriage, his wife's income from writing far exceeded his. Leighton was the literary editor of the Daily Mail from 1896 to 1899.

The Leightons had four children:

- Their first child was accidentally smothered in infancy by a nurse.
- Roland Aubrey Leighton (27 March 1895 – 23 December 1915), a poet who was killed in the First World War. He was Vera Brittain's fiancé and features largely in Testament of Youth, the first instalment of her memoirs. He was his mother's favourite. "He is the only one of my children who is beautiful enough to be worth dressing" her daughter reports her as saying. Marie was devastated when Roland was killed and published an anonymous memoir of him as Boy of My Heart in 1916. The inscription chosen by the family for Roland's headstone reads: "GOODNIGHT, THOUGH LIFE AND ALL TAKE FLIGHT, NEVER GOOD-BYE."
- Clare Leighton (Note: Baptised Clare Marie Veronica Leighton on 26 May 1898,} she was also known as Clare Ellaline Hope Leighton and Clare Veronica Hope Leighton) (12 April 1898 – 4 November 1989), a writer and artist. She wrote several novels as well as the biography of her mother, and was a noted wood engraver. Marie was dismissive of her looks, ambitions and talents.
- Evelyn Ivor Robert Leighton (31 May 1901 – 21 October 1969) was destined from boyhood for the Navy. He enjoyed a long naval career, being posted to the Royal Australian Navy for a while, and married an English bride while he was there.

Leighton's day-to-day influence on the household was limited by his deafness. He was so deaf by the time his children were growing up, that he was able to write his adventure books sitting next to his wife while she dictated her next melodrama. Leighton was older and wiser than Marie, and helped Clare's artistic development. His daughter recalls that Leighton adored his wife and that he had something of a cherishing paternal attitude towards her.

== Work ==
Leighton produced four types of output:

- Adventure stories for boys.
- Melodramas written together with his wife, the most famous being Convict 99 (1898).
- Books about dogs starting with Cassell's two-volume New Book of the Dog in 1907.
- Short stories and serials for boys' papers.

In a memoir, Larry McMurtry (American novelist, essayist, bookseller and screenwriter) said Leighton's Sergeant Silk: the prairie scout (about a fictional member of the Royal Canadian Mounted Police), was one of the first books McMurtry ever read. He had been given it by a young relative departing to fight in World War II.

One enormous job Leighton did undertake was the editing of Hall Caine's Life of Christ. When he began this work, the book had some three-million words. Leighton managed to reduce this to some 750,000 before his death in 1934. It was eventually published in 1938, but Leighton's contribution was not mentioned by Caine's sons in their introduction to the work.

=== Example of illustrations from a historical novel by Leighton ===
The following illustrations by Alfred Pearse (1856–1933) for The Thirsty Sword – a story of the Norse invasion of Scotland (1262–1263) give an idea of the pacing of Leighton's writing in a novel which was meant to teach history as well as entertain.

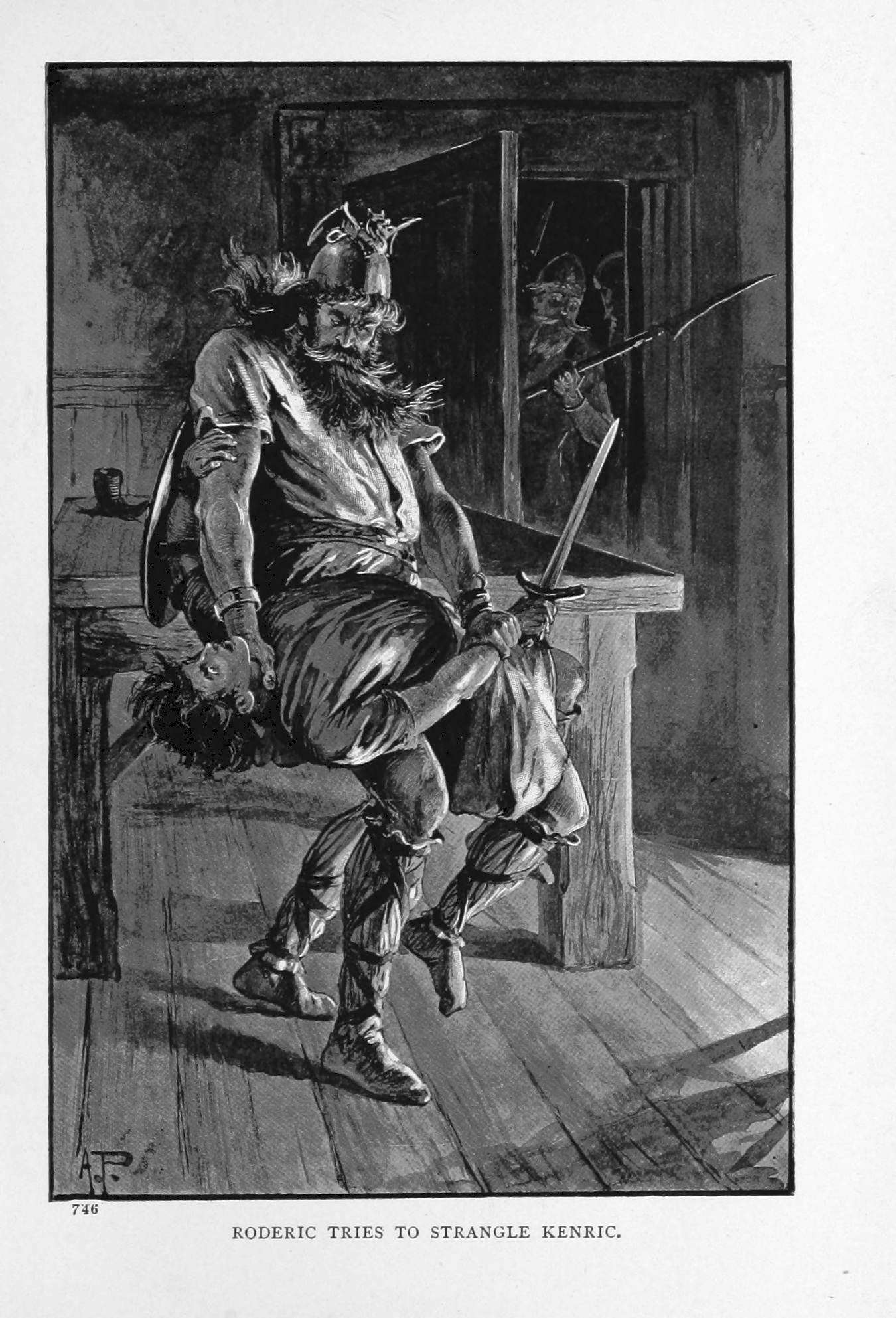
Page 60

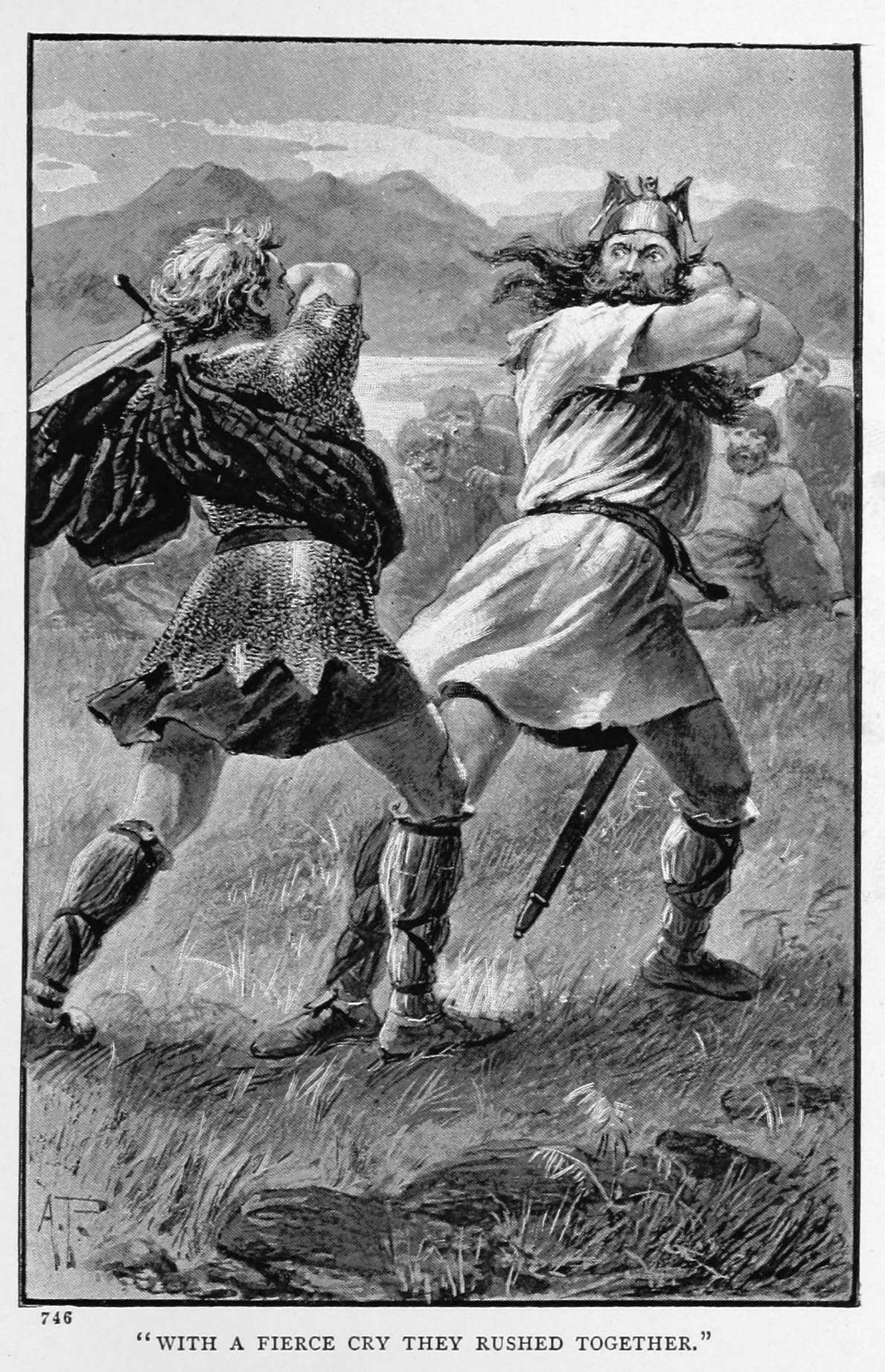
Page 87

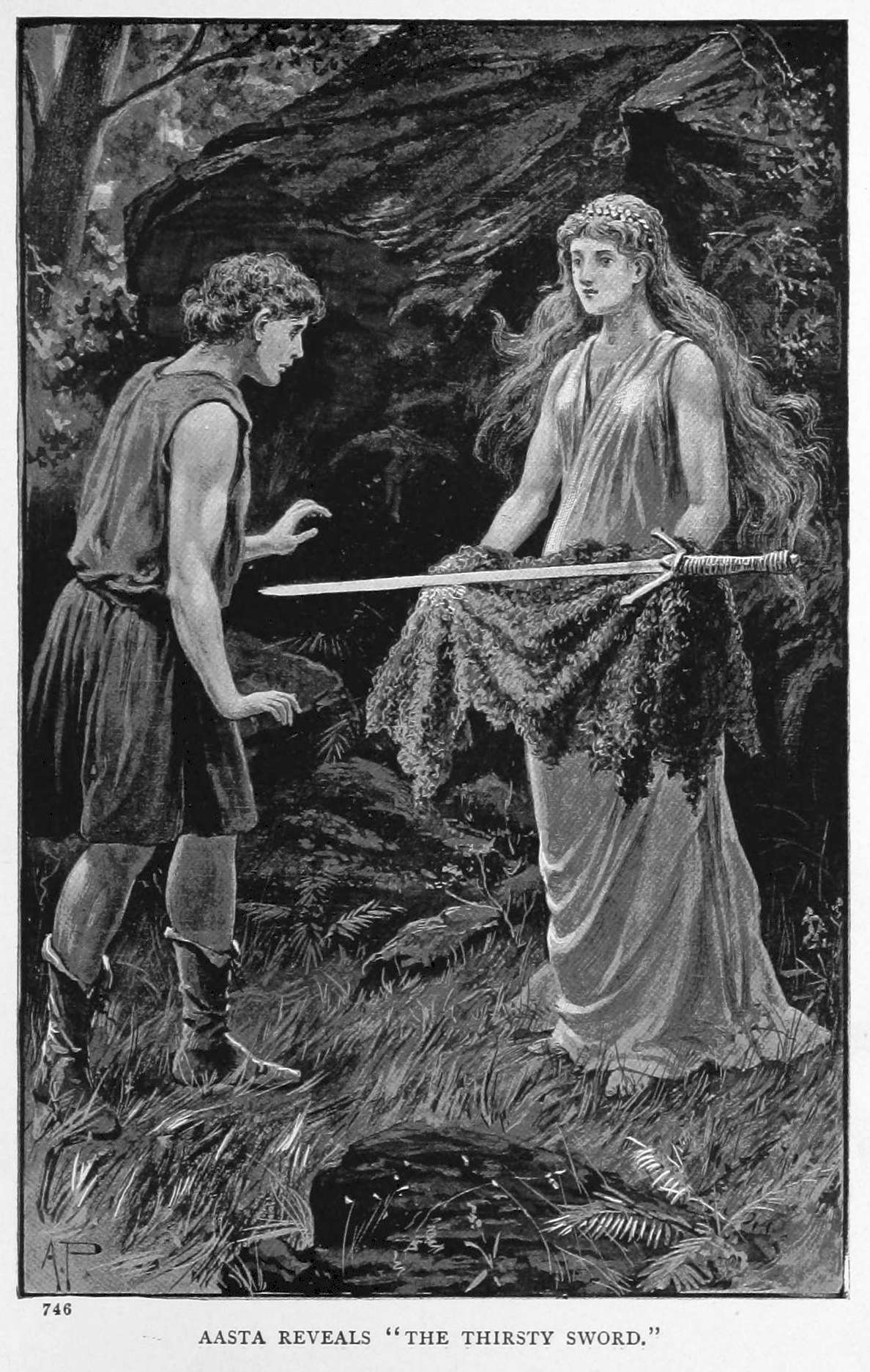
Page 106

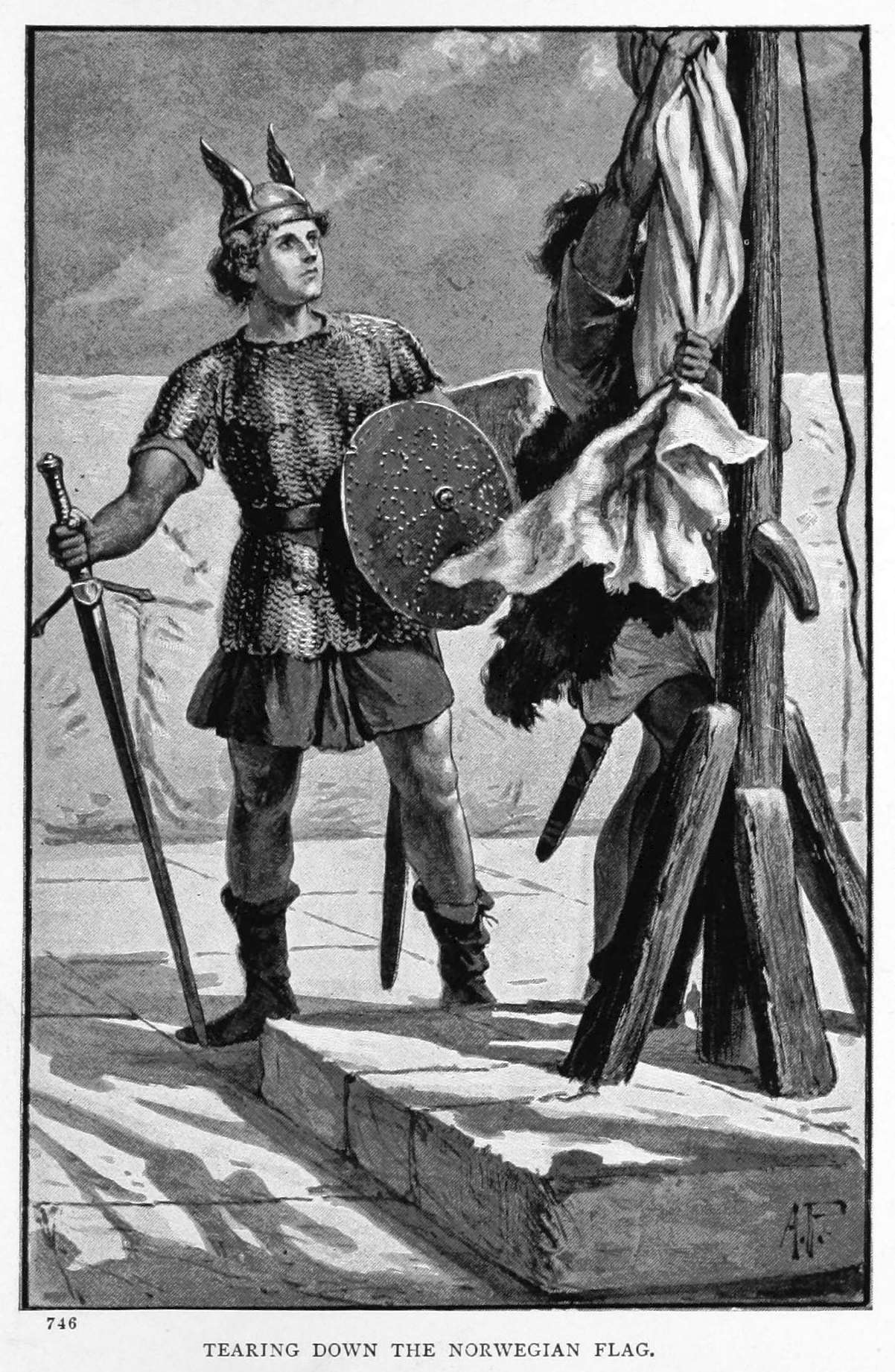
Page 188

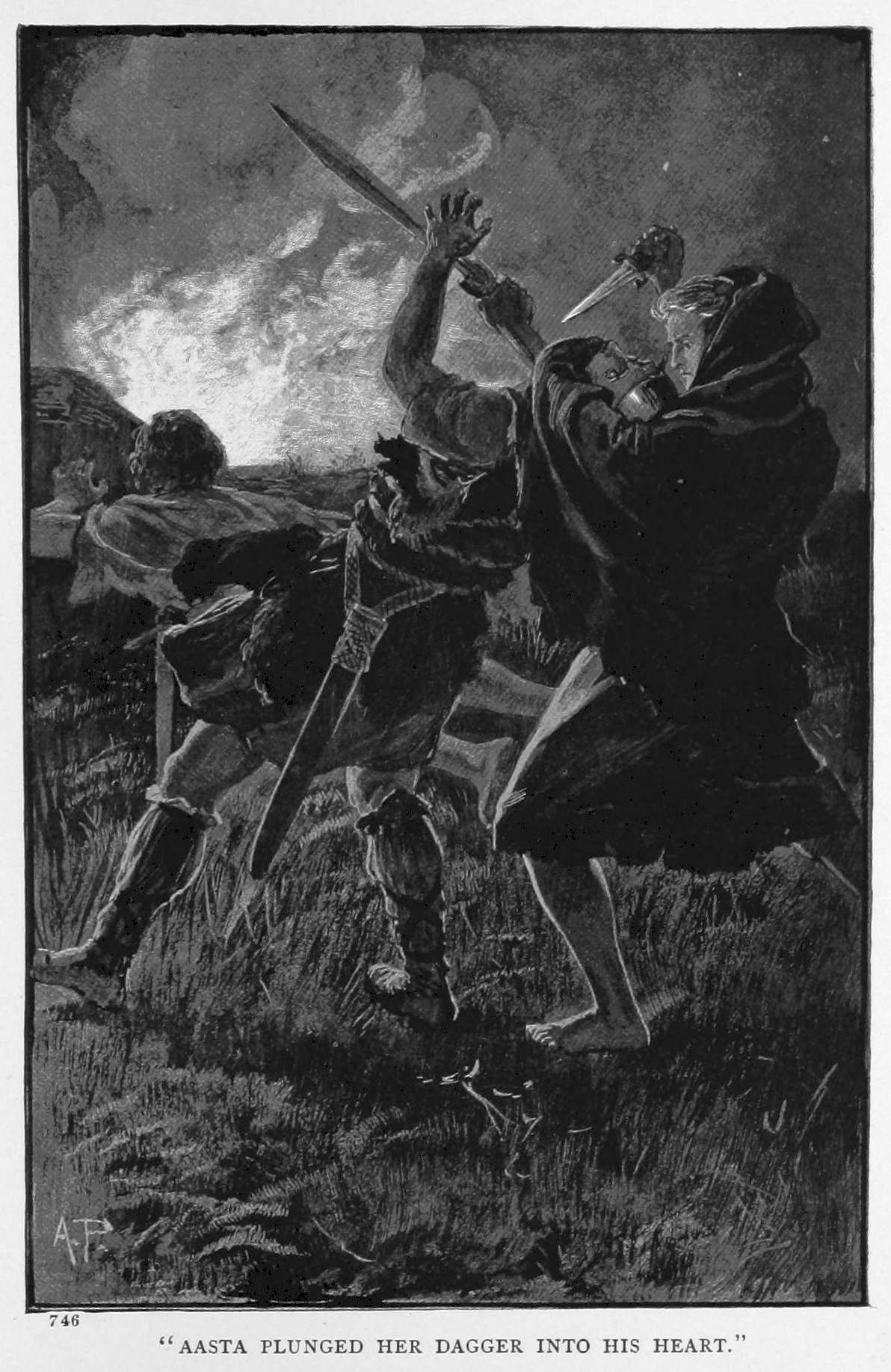
Page 227

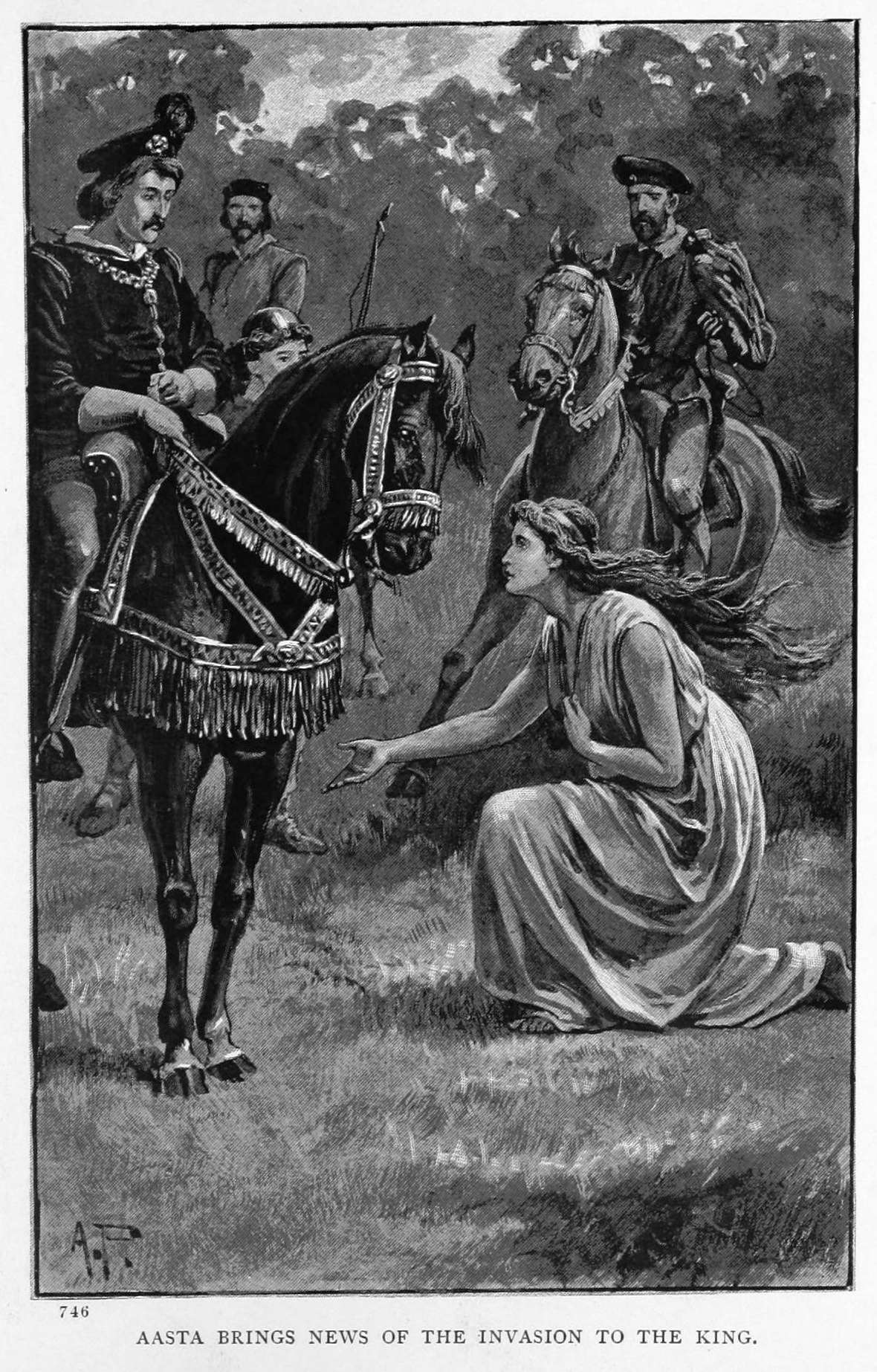
Page 268

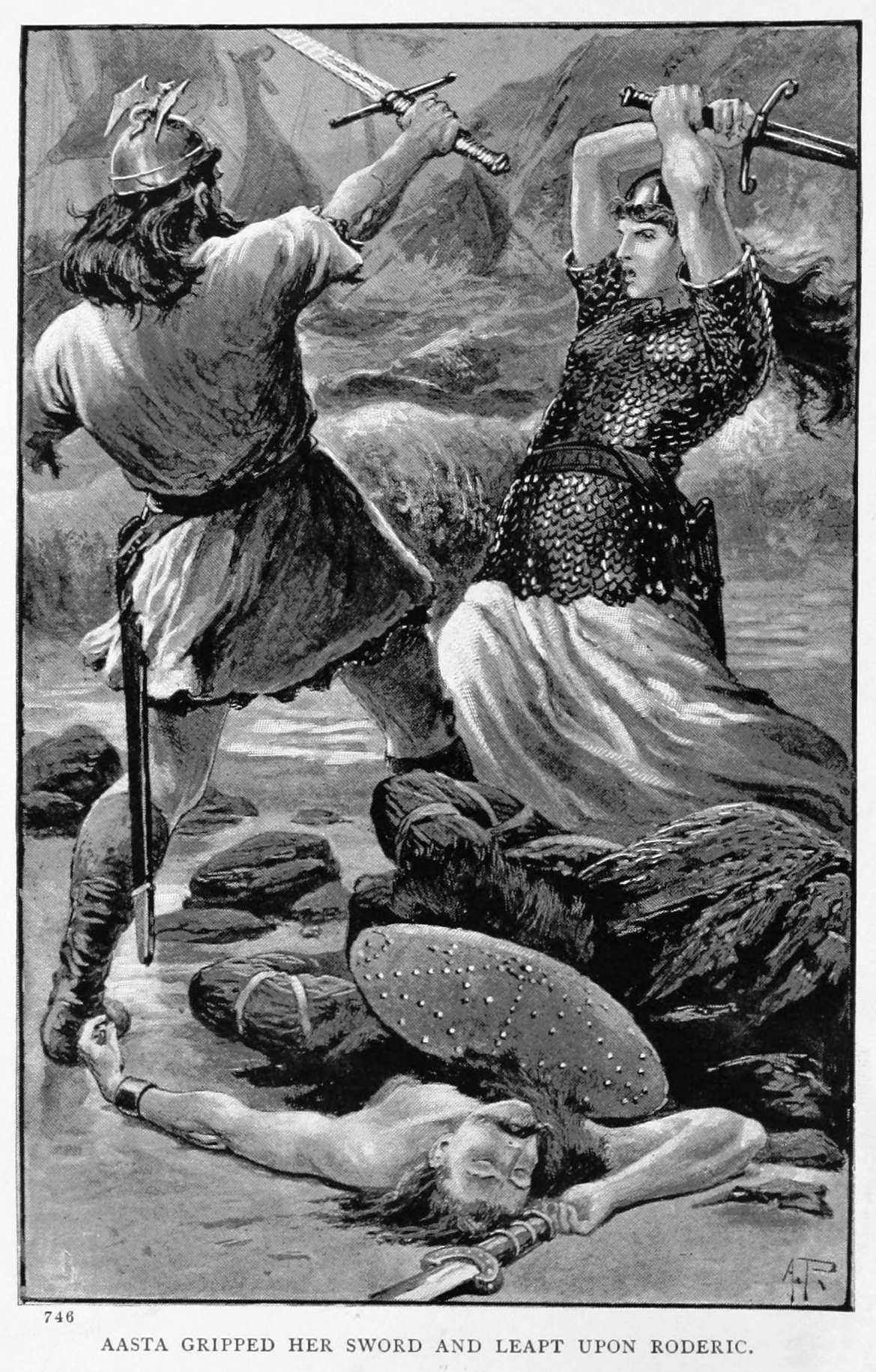
Page 301

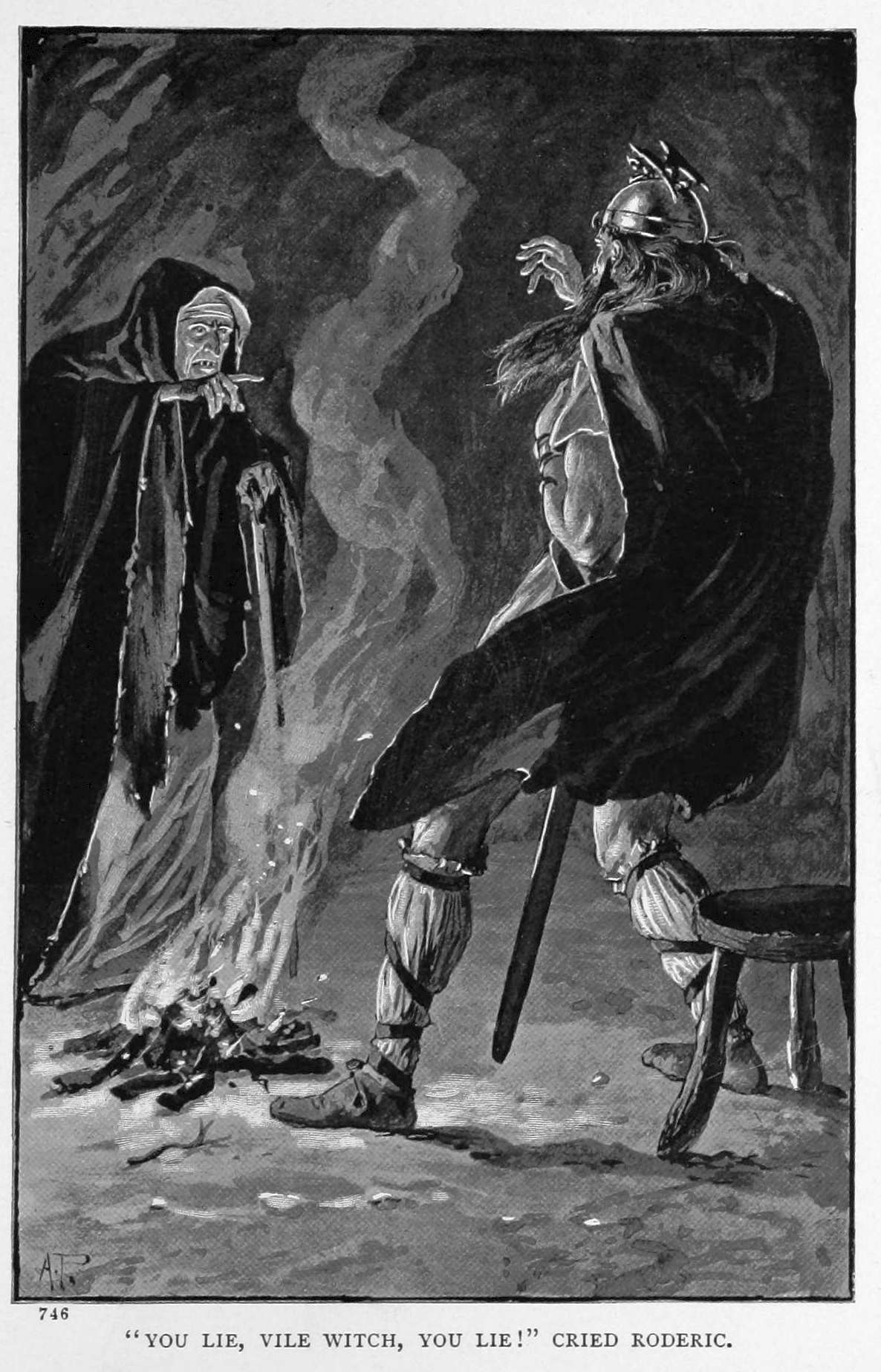
Page 323

=== List of long works ===
The following is a list, drawn from the Jisc Library Hub Discover collated catalogue. (Note: Library Hub Discover is a database collating 161 UK and Irish academic, national & specialist library catalogues.)

Details of Book full title, secondary authors and publisher
Serial	Year	Title	Other authors	Publisher
1	1892	The pilots of Pomona: a story of the Orkney Islands		London: Blackie & Son
2	1893	The thirsty sword: a story of the Norse invasion of Scotland (1262–1263)		London: Blackie & Son
3	1894	In the Grip of the Algerine. A historical tale, etc.		London: Sunday School Union
4	1894	Wreck of the Golden Fleece. The story of a North Sea fisher-boy, etc.		London: Blackie & Son
5	1895	Olaf the Glorious: a historical story of the Viking age, etc.		London: Blackie & Son
6	1896	Under the Foeman's Flag: a story of the Spanish Armada, etc.		London: Andrew Melrose
7	1910	The golden galleon: being a narrative of the adventures of Master Gilbert Oglander, and of how, in the year 1591 he fought under the gallant Sir Richard Grenville in the great sea-fight off Flores, on board Her Majesty's ship The Revenge		London: Blackie and Son
8	1898	Convict 99: a true story of penal servitude	Marie Connor	London: Grant Richards
9	1898	The splendid stranger: a story of the Monmouth rebellion		London: The Sunday School Union
10	1901	In the grip of the Corsair: being the personal narrative of Sir Lester Willoughby, Knight		London: Andrew Melrose
11	1901	In the shadow of guilt: a novel	Marie Connor	London: Grant Richards
12	1902	Cap'n Nat's Treasure: a tale of Old Liverpool, etc.		London: S. W. Partridge & Co
13	1902	The Boys of Waveney, etc.		London: Grant Richards
14	1903	Fighting fearful odds, or, The temptations of Jack Rodney		London: Andrew Melrose
15	1903	In the land of the Ju-Ju: a tale of Benin, the city of blood		London: Andrew Melrose
16	1903	The haunted ship: a tale of the Devon smugglers		London: Andrew Melrose
17	1903	The Kidnapping of Peter Cray. A story of the South Seas, etc.		London: Grant Richards
18	1904	Hurrah! for the Spanish Main: a tale of Drake's third voyage to Darien, etc.		London: Andrew Melrose
19	1904	The Other Fellow; or, the Heir from the Colonies, etc.		London: Andrew Melrose
20	1905	The boy and his school: what it can and what it cannot give him		London: J. Murray
21	1905	The green painted ship		London: Andrew Melrose
22	1905	With Nelson in Command: a story of adventure in the battle of the Baltic, etc.		London: Andrew Melrose
23	1906	Gipsy Kit; or the man with the tattooed face		London: S. W. Partridge & Co
24	1906	Monitor at Megson's. A master, a schoolboy and a secret		London: Cassell and Company
25	1907	A bit of a bounder, or, The surreptitious cigarette		London: Sunday School Union
26	1907	The new book of the dog		London: Cassel and Company
27	1909	Gildersley's Tenderfoot. A story of Redskin and prairie		London: C. Arthur Pearson
28	1910	Dogs and all about them		London: Cassell and Company
29	1910	Kiddie of the camp: a story of the western prairies		London: C. Arthur Pearson
30	1910	My Memoirs. [With an introduction by Robert Leighton, and with illustrations.]	Princess Caroline Murat	London: Eveleigh Nash
31	1910	The cleverest chap in the school		London: Jarrold & Sons
32	1911	Coo-ee!: a story of peril and adventure in the South Seas		London: C. Arthur Pearson
33	1911	The kidnapped regiment: a story of 1745		London: Pilgrim Press
34	1911	The perils of Peterkin: a story of adventure in north-west Canada		London: Jarrold & Sons
35	1912	Rattlesnake Ranch. A story of adventure in the great North West		London: C. Arthur Pearson
36	1912	The bravest boy in the camp: a story of adventure on the western prairies		London: Jarrold & Sons
37	1913	Sergeant Silk: the prairie scout		London: Jarrold & Sons
38	1915	The red patrol: a story of the North-West Mounted Police		London: Jarrold & Sons
39	1916	Dreadnoughts of the Dogger: a story of the war on the North Sea		London: Ward, Lock & Co
40	1917	Woolly of the wilds: a story of pluck and adventure in North-West Canada		London: Ward, Lock & Co
41	1920	Kiddie the scout		London: C. Arthur Pearson
42	1922	The complete book of the dog		London: Cassell and Company
43	1922	The white man's trail: a story of adventure and mystery in the Canadian wilds		London: C. Arthur Pearson
44	1923	Sea Scout and Savage, etc.		London: Ward, Lock & Co
45	1923	The Black Prince of Africa. A sketch for boys, etc.		London: United Council for Missionary Education
46	1924	Kiddie the prairie rider		London: C. Arthur Pearson
47	1924	Your dog		London: Cassell and Company
48	1926	Softfoot of Silver Creek		London: Ward, Lock & Co
49	1928	A jewel of the seas		London: John F. Shaw
50	1928	The popular Chow Chow: its history, strains, pedigrees, breeding, character and kennel management		London: Popular Dogs Pub. Co
51	1929	Who killed lord Luxmore?	Marie Connor	London: C. Arthur Pearson
52	1930	The Red Shadow [and other tales]		London: Collins
53	1932	The Dalmatian and all about it	James Saunders	Idle, Bradford: Watmoughts Ltd

Further details on long works. The columns PG, IA, HT, and BL indicate if online texts are available at:

- PG – Project Gutenberg
- IA – The Internet Archive
- HT – The HathiTrust
- BL – The British Library

=== Example of illustrations from an adventure story by Leighton ===
While still set in a historical tale, The Golden Galleon was more of an adventure story than a history lesson. It was illustrated by William Rainey.

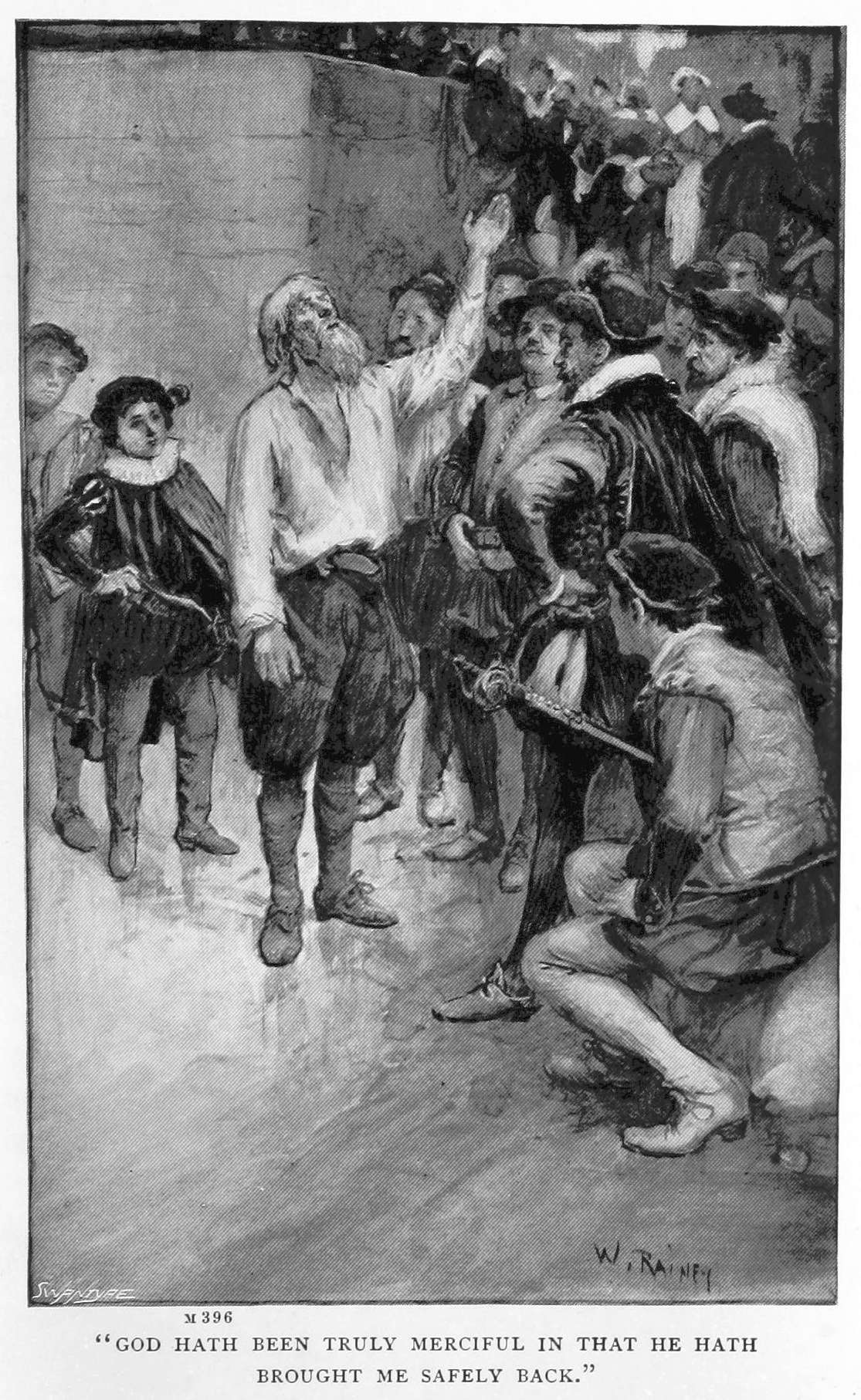
Page 48

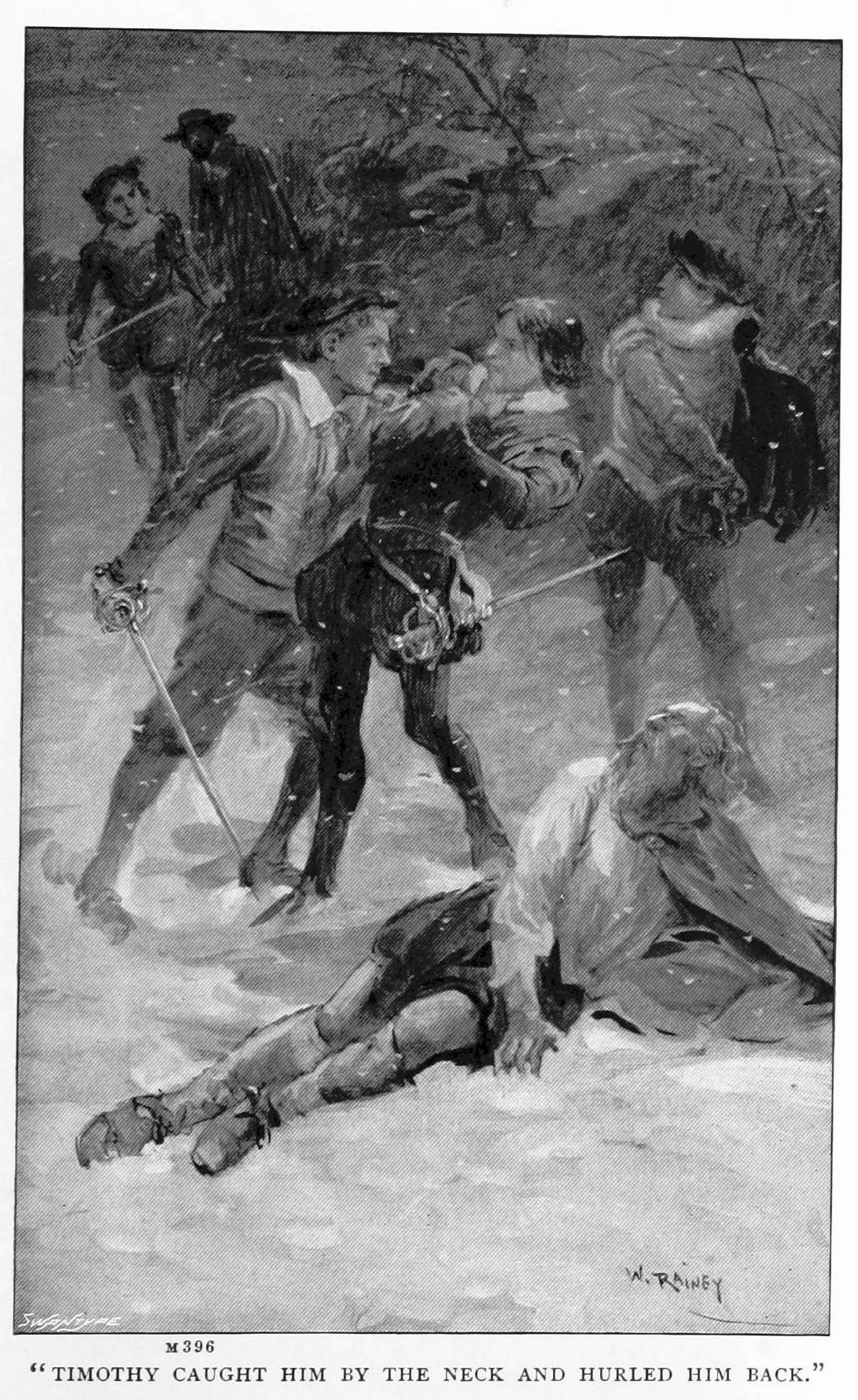
Page 73

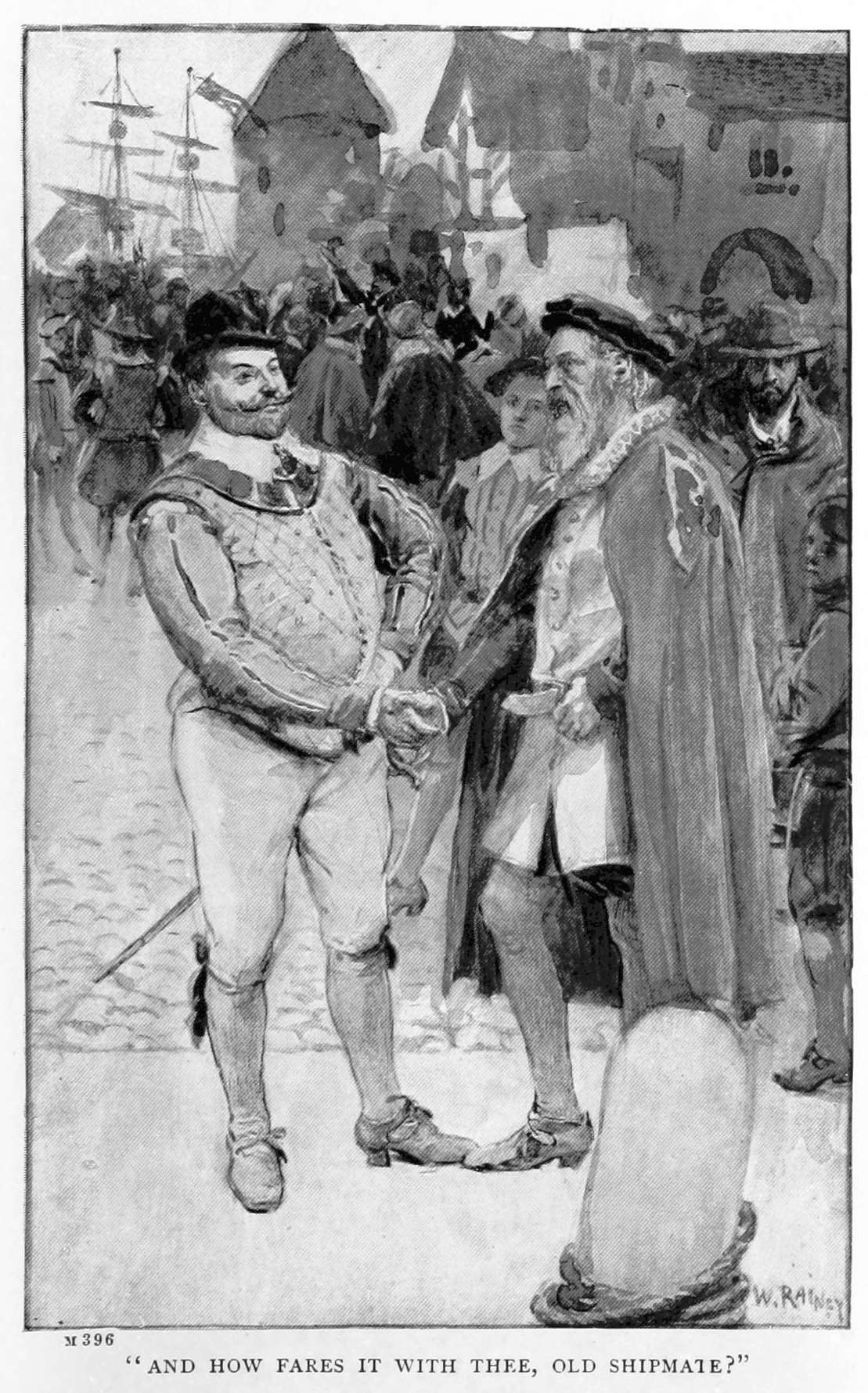
Page 147

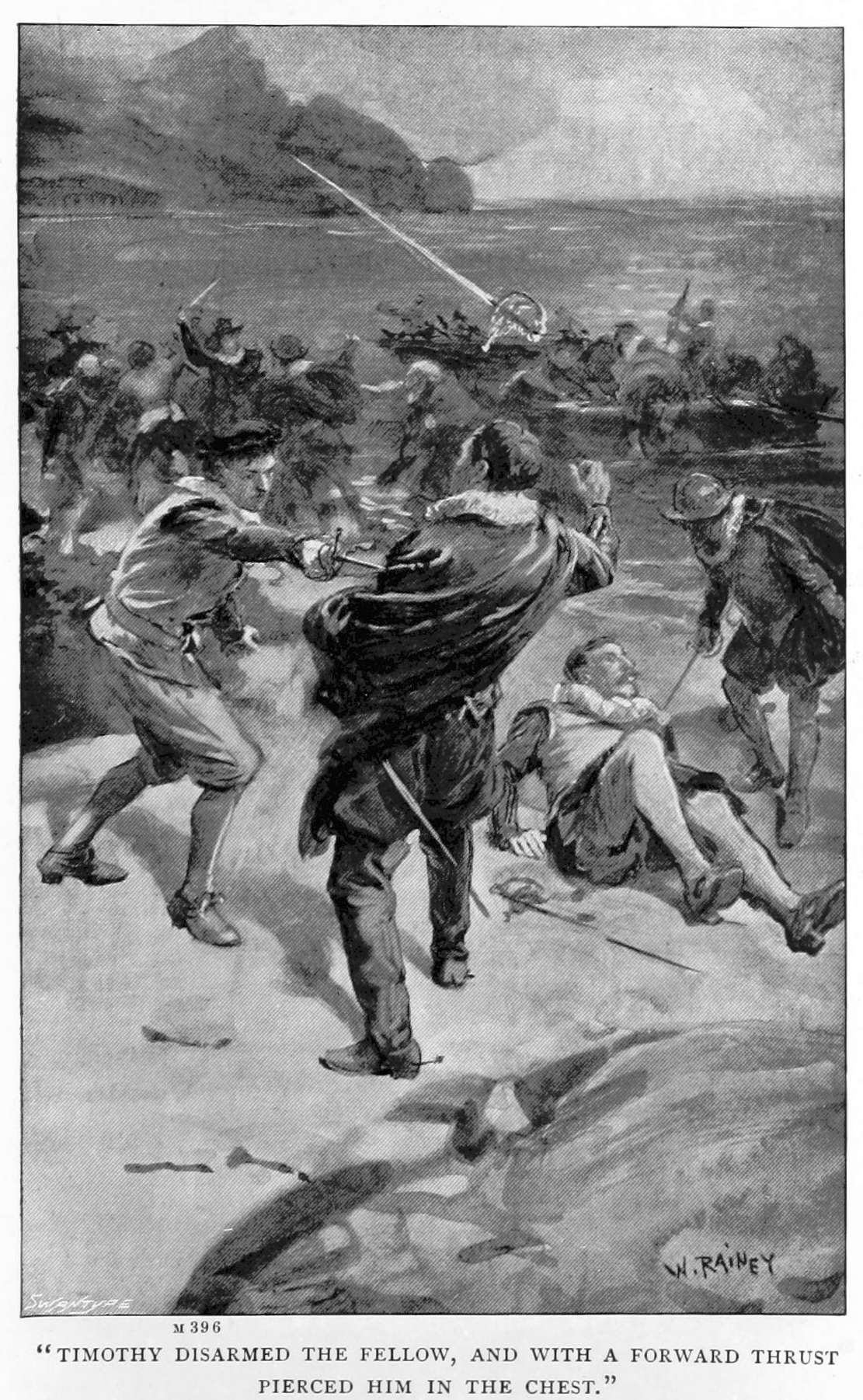
Page 191

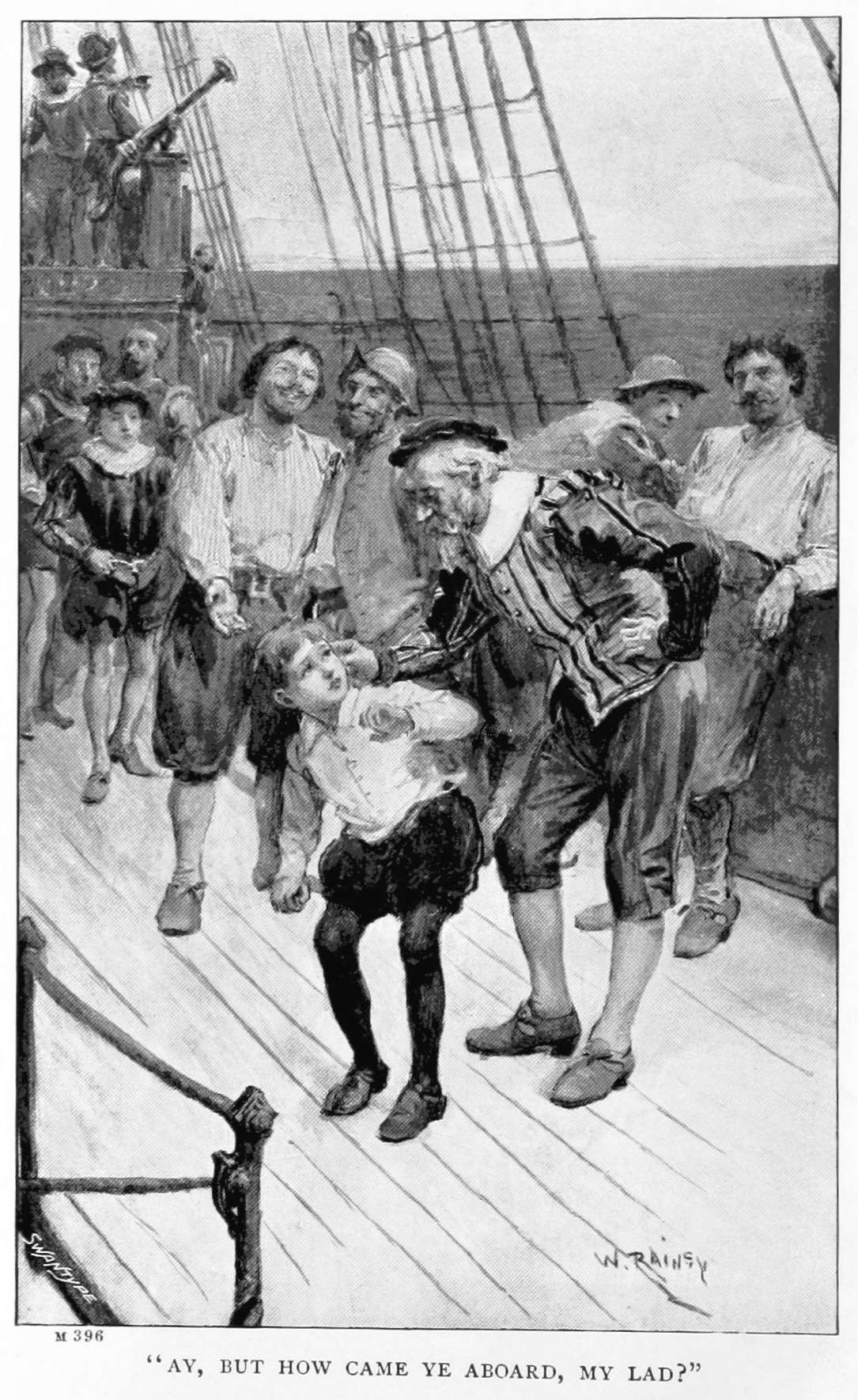
Page 219

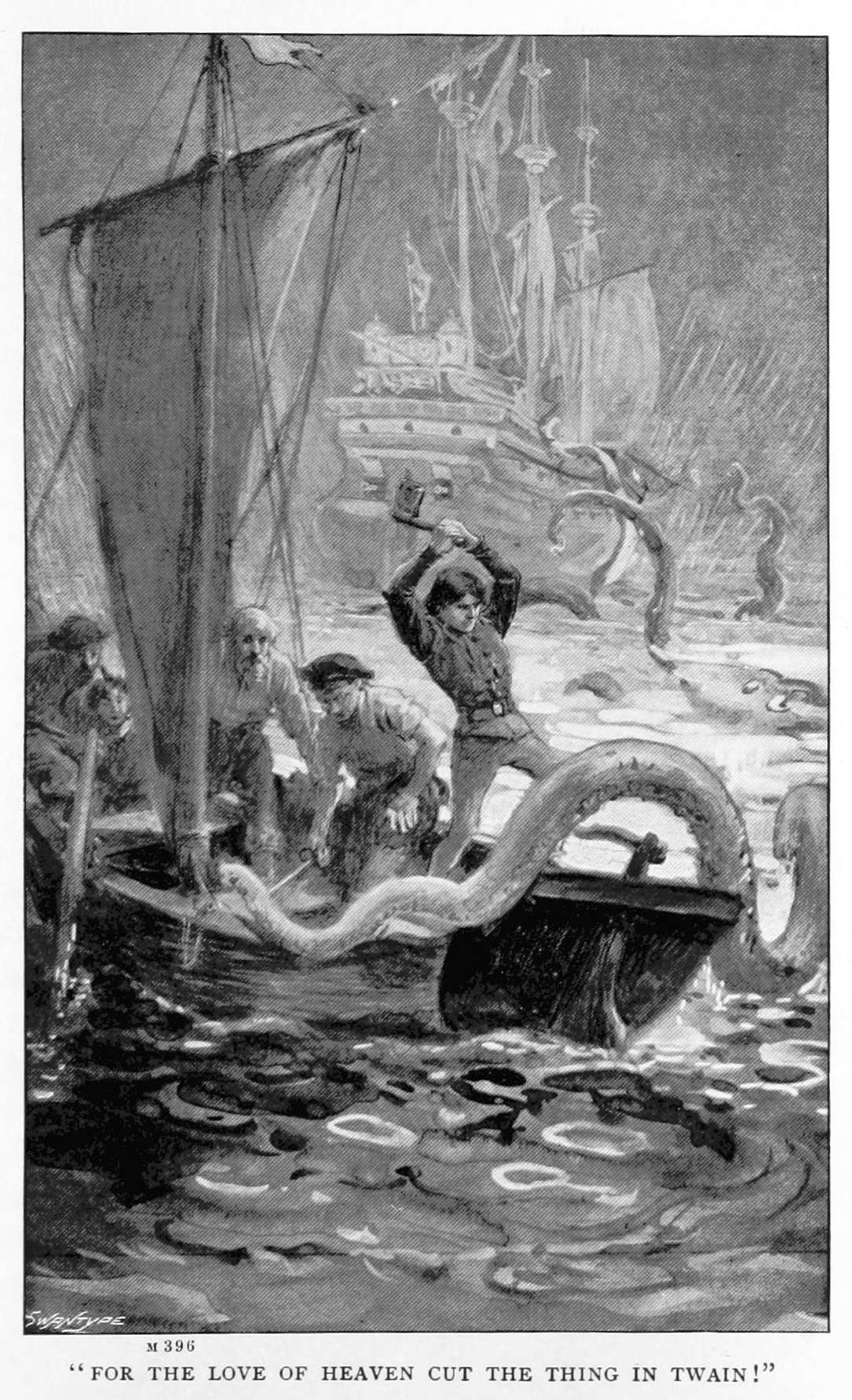
Page 253

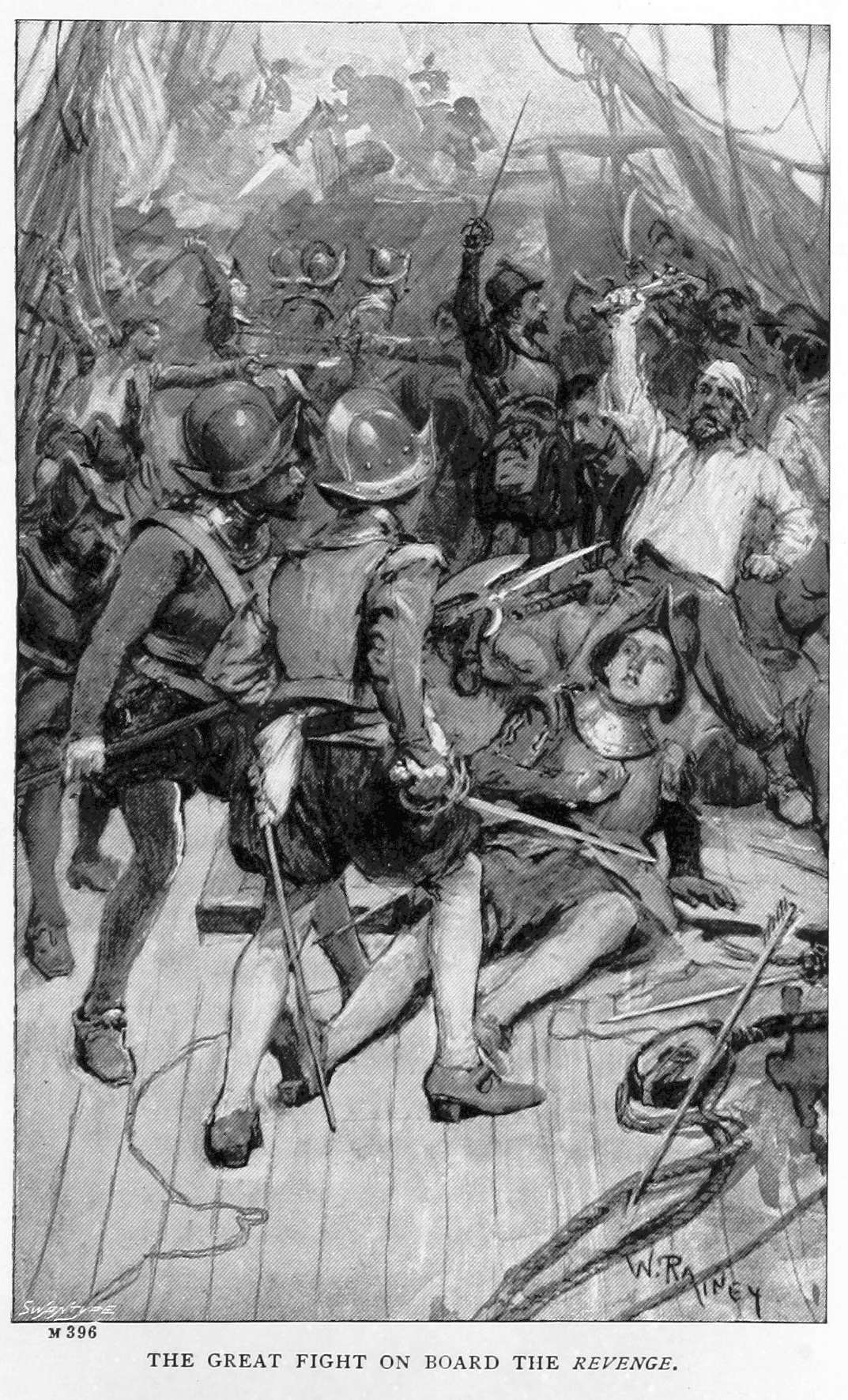
Page 300

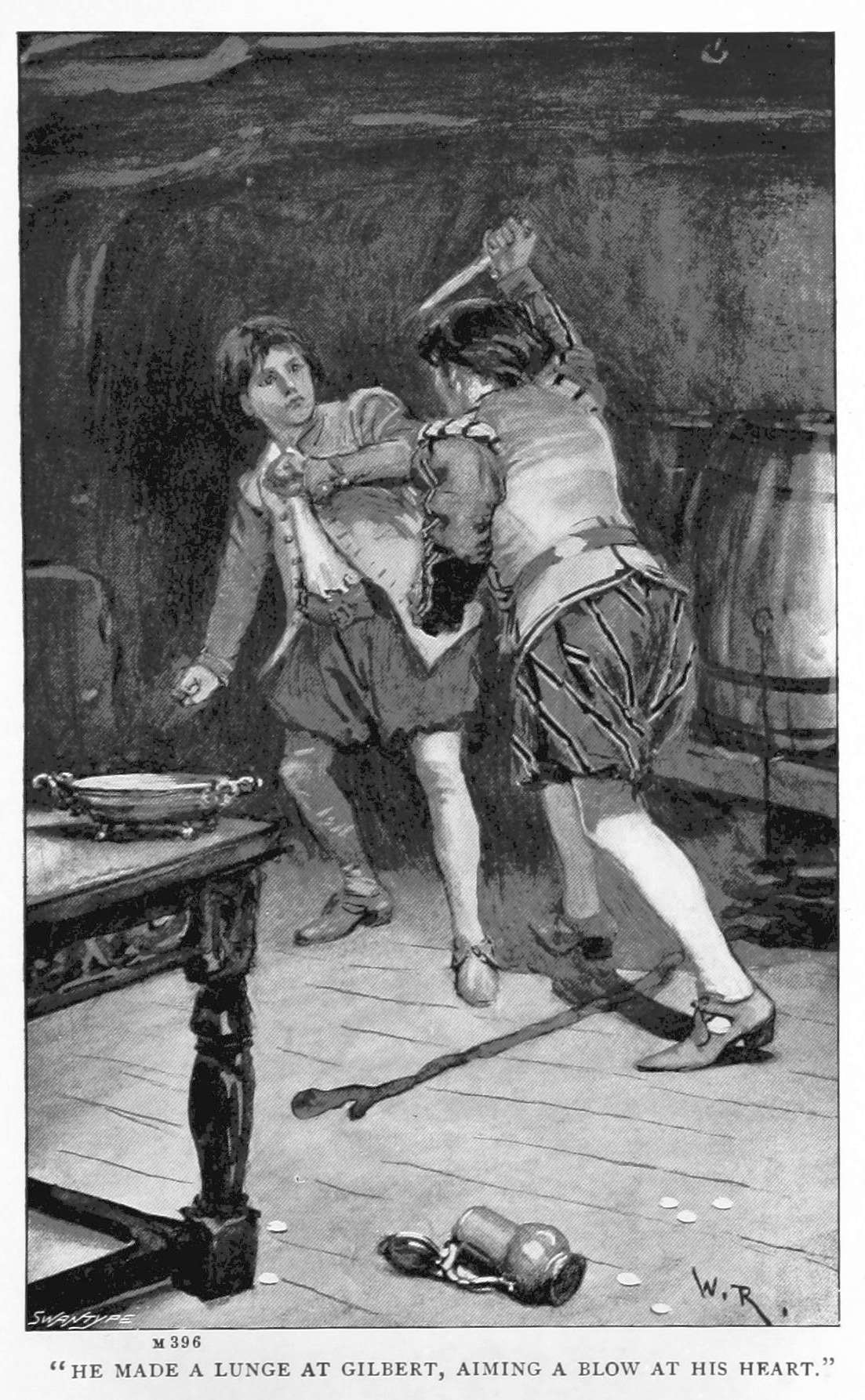
Page 342

=== Shorter works ===
Leighton published both short stories and serials in publications such as Cheer, Boys, Cheer, Boys Realm, Boys Herald, Comic Cuts, Chums, and Scout.

== Death ==
Leighton died age 75 in Bishop's Stortford, Hertfordshire on 11 May 1934. His estate was valued at £286.
