= Simon Brailsford =

Equerry to Queen Elizabeth II

Squadron Leader Simon Brailsford was Equerry to Queen Elizabeth II between 1998 and 2001. He was a career Royal Air Force officer, specialising as a navigator. He was promoted to squadron leader 1 January 1997, and was later promoted to wing commander and group captain.
