= John Brailsford the elder =

English cleric and poet

John Brailsford
- Occupation: Poet
- Writing career
- Language: English

John Brailsford the elder (1692–1765) was an English cleric and poet.

He is in some literature referred to as "John Brailsford the elder", to distinguish him from his son John Brailsford the younger, who was also a cleric.

John was born 10 May 1692, the son of John Brailsford, a tinman and pewterer.

John was educated at Merchant Taylors' School and St. John's College, Cambridge, where he was admitted as a sizar (B.A. 1712, M.A. 1717).

John was ordained as a Deacon Mar 1715 and ordained as a Priest May 1716 by Bishop William Dawes, at York Minster. His first appointment was Curate of Kirkby In Ashfield, Nottinghamshire, assisting his uncle, Matthew Brailsford Rector of Kirkby In Ashfield and simultaneously Dean of Wells. In 1719 John received his first appointment as Rector of St Bartholomew's Church in Blore Ray, Staffordshire, which he held until 1728. Simultaneously in 1726 John was Curate of Blaston, Leicestershire assisting Mr Anthony Mainwaring, Rector of Blaston and Vicar of Horninghold. Inside the church at Horninghold one can see a Monumental Inscription on a white stone in the floor, under the center of the upper arch, between the North aisle and nave, which shows the burial of his infant son. As would be expected for a stone underfoot, the inscription is no longer readable. It was originally "H.S. // Theodofius filius Johannis Brailsford // hujus ecclefie curati // et // Elizabeth uxor ejus, obiit infans Jan. 18, A.D. 1727. // Beati funt innocentes which translates to “Here lies Theodosius son of John Brailsford, of this church parish, and Elizabeth his wife. The child died Jan 18, 1727. Blessed are the innocent.” John was Vicar of Combe St Nicholas, Somerset, 1730-4. He became the Rector of Kirkby In Ashfield, Nottinghamshire in 1734 after the death of Matthew Brailsford, who previously held the title. John held this position until his death in 1765.

He wrote Derby Silk-Mill, attempted in Miltonick Verse, Nottingham, 1739.
