= H. N. Brailsford =

English journalist and writer (1873–1958)

- Born: Henry Noel Brailsford; 25 December 1873; Mirfield, West Riding of Yorkshire, England
- Died: 23 March 1958 (aged 84); Acton, London, England
- Occupations: Journalist, writer

Henry Noel Brailsford (25 December 1873 – 23 March 1958) was an English journalist and writer, considered one of the most prolific left-wing journalists of the first half of the 20th century. A founding member of the Men's League for Women's Suffrage in 1907, he resigned from his job at The Daily News in 1909 when it supported the force-feeding of suffragettes on hunger strike.

== Early life ==
The son of Wesleyan Methodist minister Edward John Brailsford, Brailsford was born in the West Riding of Yorkshire and educated at the High School of Dundee in Scotland. He attended the University of Glasgow.

== Career in journalism ==
Brailsford abandoned an academic career to become a journalist, rising to prominence in the 1890s as a foreign correspondent for The Manchester Guardian, specialising in the Balkans, France and Egypt.

In 1899 he moved to London, working for the Morning Leader and then The Daily News. He led a British relief mission to Macedonia in 1903, publishing a book, Macedonia: Its Races and Their Future, on his return. In the book, Brailsford took a pro-Bulgarian stance.

In 1905 he was convicted of conspiring to obtain a British passport in the name of one person for another person to travel to Russia.

The Men's League for Women's Suffrage was formed in 1907 in London by Brailsford, Charles Corbett, Henry Nevinson, Laurence Housman, C. E. M. Joad, Hugh Franklin, Henry Harben, Gerald Gould, Charles Mansell-Moullin, Israel Zangwill and 32 others. Brailsford joined the Independent Labour Party in 1907 and resigned from The Daily News in 1909 when it supported force-feeding of suffragette prisoners. He co-authored with Dr Jessie Murray, a psychologist and suffragette, a report The Treatment of Women's Deputations by the Metropolitan Police, over the violence of the Metropolitan Police during the Black Friday demonstration (18 November 1910). Over the next decade he wrote several books, among them Adventures in Prose (1911), Shelley, Godwin and their Circle (1913), War of Steel and Gold (1914), Origins of the Great War (1914), Belgium and the Scrap of Paper (1915) and A League of Nations (1917).

In 1913–14 Brailsford was a member of the international commission sent by the Carnegie Endowment for International Peace to investigate the conduct of the Balkan Wars of 1912–13. He co-authored its report.

He was a prominent member of the Union of Democratic Control during the First World War and stood unsuccessfully as a Labour Party candidate in the 1918 general election. He subsequently toured central Europe and his graphic accounts of life in the defeated countries appeared in his books Across the Blockade (1919) and After the Peace (1920).

Brailsford went to Soviet Russia in 1920 and again to the USSR in 1926, publishing two books on the subject. He was editor of the New Leader, the ILP newspaper, from 1922 to 1926. He left the ILP in 1932 and through the 1930s was a regular contributor to Reynold's News and the New Statesman. Brailsford was an outspoken critic of Mussolini's Italy and Hitler's Germany.

His books in the 1930s include the anti-colonialist classic Rebel India (1931) and the anti-militarist Property or Peace? (1934). In the late 1930s, he was one of the few writers associated with the Left Book Club, the New Statesman and Tribune who was consistently critical of the Soviet show trials.

Following the Soviet invasion of Finland, Brailsford published a hostile essay about Stalin in the left-wing Reynold's News:

Stalin ... has compelled us to pass the judgement we had hitherto refused to register. His Russia is a totalitarian state, like another, as brutal towards the rights of others, as careless of its plighted word. If this man ever understood the international creed of socialism, he long ago forgot it. In this land the absolute power has wrought its customary effects of corruption.

During the Second World War, Brailsford penned a weekly column in Reynold's News. He also continued to write books, the most important being Subject India (1943) and Our Settlement with Germany (1944). After his retirement from journalism in 1946, he wrote a history of the Levellers, which was unfinished at the time of his death.

Paul Foot described Brailsford as "perhaps the best socialist writer in Britain at the time".

== Personal life ==
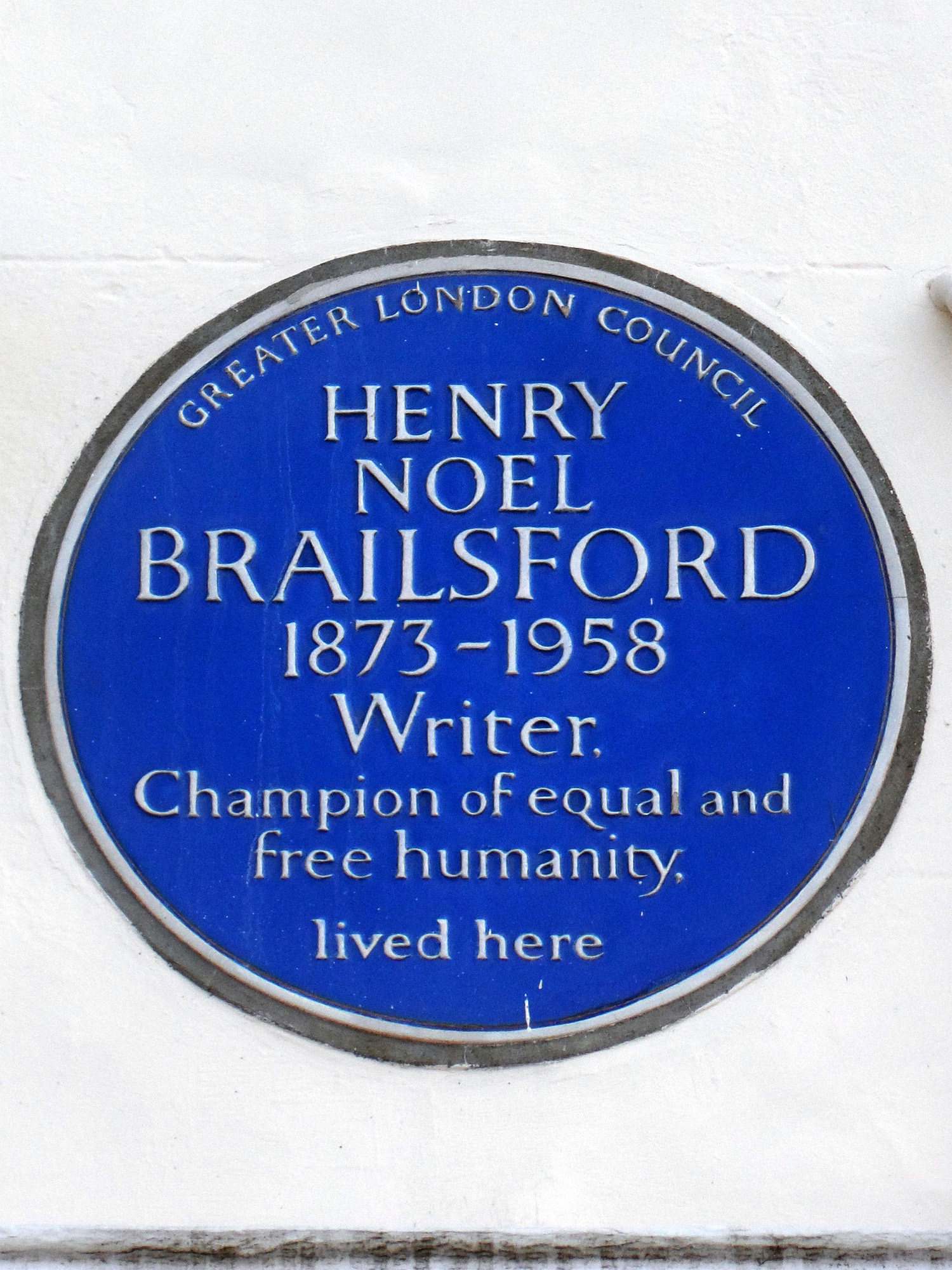
Blue plaque commemorating Brailsford in Belsize Park Gardens, Hampstead

He married a former student, the women's activist Jane Esdon Malloch, in 1898. She denied him children and regarded the marriage as demeaning. They separated but she refused him a divorce.

In 1928 he met the artist Clare Leighton and they lived together for several years. His wife died in 1937 after years of drinking, and while this removed any legal obstacle to the couple being married, Brailsford, consumed by guilt, suffered an emotional breakdown, effectively destroying his relationship with Leighton who left for the US in 1939.

In 1944 he married Evamaria Perlmann, a refugee from Germany, 40 years his junior.

Brailsford was an advocate of animal rights and was a vegetarian. In opposition to G. K. Chesterton he defended the practice of vegetarianism in The Daily News. His fondness for animals was a lifelong trait and he found it easier to show affection to animals as they did not betray or disappoint him. He opposed blood sports and several of his essays allude to his friendship with cats.

== Bibliography ==
- Broom of the War God: a novel (1898)
- Some Irish problems (1903)
- Macedonia: Its Races and Their Future (1906)
- Treatment of the Women's Deputations by the police (1911), with Jessie Murray
- The Fruits of our Russian Alliance (1912)
- Shelley, Godwin and their Circle (1913)
- The War of Steel and Gold: A Study of the Armed Peace (1914)
- The Origins of the Great War (1914)
- Belgium and the scrap of paper (1915)
- A League of Nations (1917)
- A Share In Your Motherland and other articles (1918)
- Covenant of peace; an essay on the league of nations (1919) with an introduction by Herbert Croly.
- The Russian workers' republic (1921)
- After the peace (1922)
- The Pros and Cons of P.R.: A plea for reconsideration (1924)
- Socialism for To-Day (1925)
- The Living Wage (1926)
- Families and incomes (1926)
- How the Soviets Work (1927)
- Olives of Endless Age: being a Study of this distracted world and its need of unity (1928)
- Scrap Battleships! (1930)
- Rebel India (1931)
- If We Want Peace (1932)
- Property or Peace? (1934)
- Towards a New League (1935)
- Voltaire (1935)
- Spain's Challenge to Labour (1936)
- Why Capitalism Means War (1938)
- Democracy for India (1939)
- America our Ally (1940)
- From England to America: A Message (1940)
- The Habsburgs-Never again! (1943)
- Subject India (1943)
- Our Settlement with Germany (1944)
- Making Germany Pay? (1944)
- Fabian Colonial Essays (1945) introduced by A. Creech Jones, edited by Rita Hinden
- The Life-Work of J. A. Hobson (1948)
- Essays, Poems and Tales of Henry W. Nevinson, chosen from his works (1948)
- Mahatma Gandhi (1948) with Frederick Pethick-Lawrence and Henry S. L. Polak
- The Levellers and the English revolution (1961), with Christopher Hill (historian)

Media offices
Preceded by Katherine Glasier	Editor of the New Leader; 1922–1926	Succeeded by Fenner Brockway
