= Jane Esdon Brailsford =

Scottish suffragette

- Born: Jane Esdon Malloch; 3 April 1874; Elderslie, Renfrewshire, Scotland
- Died: 9 April 1937 (aged 63); Chiswick, London, England
- Education: University of Glasgow; Somerville College, Oxford
- Known for: Suffragette
- Spouse: H. N. Brailsford

Jane Esdon Brailsford, née Jane Esdon Malloch, (3 April 1874 – 9 April 1937) was a Scottish suffragette.

== Life ==
Brailsford was born in Elderslie, Renfrewshire, in 1874 and was educated at the University of Glasgow, and later Somerville College, Oxford. Henry Brailsford, one of her tutors at the University of Glasgow pestered her to marry him on her return from Somerville, and after some reluctance she agreed. The marriage began with a trip to Crete. Brailsford had work there as a correspondent for The Manchester Guardian. Her marriage was unhappy and some say unconsummated. Bertrand Russell considered that she had made the lack of consummation a condition of the marriage because she was obsessed by another of her University of Glasgow tutors, Gilbert Murray. However Murray was married and had rejected her, whereas her new husband had a new and successful career before him.

== Suffragette activism ==
Brailsford could not find any success at either painting or acting. She regarded her marriage as a burden, and refused to have children but she found success when she joined the Women's Social and Political Union in 1909. On 24 September the suffragettes were alarmed to find that the government had started to force feed suffragettes who were on hunger strike in jail. Jane's husband resigned from The Daily News in protest and on 9 October the suffragettes prepared for Lloyd George to visit Newcastle. On 8 October she was amongst twelve who agreed to demonstrate with Christabel Pankhurst, including Constance Lytton, Annie Kenney, Kitty Marion, Emily Davison, Lily Asquith, Dorothy Shallard, Ellen Pifield and Dorothy Pethick. Brailsford was arrested for wielding an axe at a barricade put up to control their demonstration at Newcastle's Palace Theatre. She was released after spending just three days of her one-month sentence in prison. This is thought to be due to her being the wife of a well-known journalist, which annoyed her as she had hoped her imprisonment would have more influence on Liberal opinion. Undeterred she was rearrested for a similar offence on 21 November. She had a need to be seen in high-profile acts and these continued until 1912.

Brailsford took one of the 150 platforms at the Hyde Park rally in 1910, of 10,000 women along with leading suffragettes and Henry Nevinson, a close friend. Her husband Henry and Nevinson were founding members of the new Men's League For Women's Suffrage and in 1910 he had persuaded Millicent Fawcett that he should intercede to see if he could negotiate a settlement between the politicians and the suffragists.

In October 1912 her arguments with her husband over her and the WSPU's militant struggle rose to a head as Frederick and Emmeline Pethick-Lawrence were forced to leave the WSPU. Brailsford resigned too in protest.

== Later life ==
Brailsford broke down after this and for much of the rest of her life she suffered from depression and alcoholism. She finally left her husband in 1921 and although he found a new partner, the artist Clare Leighton, Jane refused him a divorce.

Brailsford died in Chiswick in 1937 from pneumonia and cirrhosis of the liver.
