= John Brailsford the younger =

John Brailsford the younger (died 1775) was an English cleric, headmaster and author.

Brailsford, after completing his education at Emmanuel College, Cambridge (B.A. 1744, M.A. 1766), was appointed in 1766 to the head-mastership of the free school at Birmingham, which situation he held till his death on 25 November 1775. He was also vicar of North Wheatley, Nottinghamshire, and chaplain to Francis, lord Middleton. He published 'The Nature and Efficacy of the Fear of God,' an assize sermon preached at Warwick (London, 1761); and an octavo volume, containing 'Thirteen Sermons on various Subjects' by him, was published at Birmingham the year after his death.
