= Testament of Youth (disambiguation) =

Testament of Youth is a book by Vera Brittain.

Testament of Youth can also refer to two adaptations:

- Testament of Youth (TV series)
- Testament of Youth (film)
