= Testament of Youth =

Memoir by Vera Brittain covering 1900–1925

- First UK edition
- Author: Vera Brittain
- Language: English
- Genre: Autobiography
- Publisher: Victor Gollancz (UK) Macmillan (US)
- Publication date: 1933
- Publication place: United Kingdom
- Media type: Print (Hardback & Paperback)

Testament of Youth is a memoir of British nurse and activist Vera Brittain (1893–1970), published in 1933. Brittain's memoir covers the years 1900 to 1925, and continues with Testament of Experience, published in 1957, and encompassing the years 1925 to 1950. Between these two books comes Testament of Friendship (published in 1940), which is essentially a memoir of Brittain's close colleague and friend Winifred Holtby. A final segment of memoir, to be called Testament of Faith or Testament of Time, was planned by Brittain but remained unfinished at her death.

Testament of Youth has been acclaimed as a classic for its description of the impact of the First World War on the lives of women and the middle-class civilian population of the United Kingdom. The book shows how the impact extended into the postwar years. It is also considered a classic in feminist literature for its depiction of a woman's pioneering struggle to forge an independent career in a society only grudgingly tolerant of educated women.

The book has been adapted for television (1979) and for film (2014).

== Narrative ==
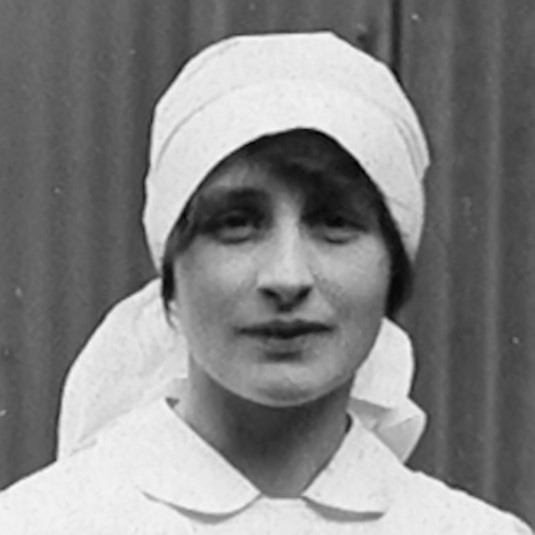
Vera Brittain

In the foreword, Brittain describes how she originally intended to write of her experiences as a novel but was unable to achieve the necessary objective distance from her subject. She then tried to publish her original diary from the war years but with all names fictionalised. This too proved unworkable. Only then did she decide to write her personal story, putting her experiences in the wider historic and social context. Several critics have noted the cathartic process by which the memoir deals with her grief at the loss of young men close to her: brother Edward Brittain, her fiancé Roland Leighton, and her friends Victor Richardson and Geoffrey Thurlow.

The narrative begins with Vera's plans to enter Somerville College, Oxford, and her romance with Roland Leighton, a friend of her brother Edward. Both were commissioned as officers early in the First World War, and were subsequently killed, as were several other members of their social circle.

The book's main subject is Vera's work as a Voluntary Aid Detachment nurse, nursing wounded soldiers in London, Malta and at Étaples in France. It also describes how she returned, disillusioned, to Somerville College after the war and completed her BA degree. It covers the beginning of her career in journalism, writing for Time and Tide and lecturing for the League of Nations. She visits the graves of her brother Edward in Italy and her fiancé Roland in France. Together with Winifred Holtby she toured the defeated and occupied regions of Germany and Austria in 1923.

It concludes with her meeting her husband George Catlin and their eventual marriage in 1925.

== Publishing history ==
- First published Victor Gollancz (28 August 1933)
- Victor Gollancz, London (1940)
- Grey Arrow paperback, Arrow Books, London (1960)
- Wideview Books (1970) ISBN 0-86068-035-5
- Virago Press (1973) ISBN 86-06-80355-3
- Fontana (1979) ISBN 0-00-635703-2
- Seaview Books (1980) B010174; 661
- Penguin Group (United States) (1980) ISBN 0-87223-672-2
- Putnam Pub Group (1980) ISBN 0-87223-672-2
- Penguin Classics (2005) ISBN 0-14-303923-7
- Publisher: Virago Press Ltd (2004) ISBN 0-86068-035-5
- Publisher: Weidenfeld & Nicolson (2009) ISBN 978-0-297-85831-7

== Publication of source materials ==
Between 1922 and 1924, Brittain had attempted to edit her war diaries for publication in response to a publisher's competition; however, when they were not selected, she focused for a time on fiction and journalism before ultimately adapting them into her memoir in 1933. The diaries on which the book is partly based were edited by Alan Bishop and published as Chronicle of Youth in 1981. In 1998, the war letters which Brittain also drew on in her autobiography were published in an edition by Bishop and Mark Bostridge. Entitled Letters from a Lost Generation, their appearance was met with considerable acclaim.

== Adaptations ==
The book was dramatised by Elaine Morgan as a five-part serial which was transmitted on BBC2 in 1979. This version features Cheryl Campbell as Vera Brittain, Peter Woodward as Roland Leighton, Joanna McCallum as Winifred Holtby and Emrys James and Jane Wenham as Vera's parents.

In 1998, to commemorate the 80th anniversary of the Armistice, a 15-part radio dramatisation of the letters on which Testament of Youth was partly based was broadcast on BBC Radio Four. Entitled Letters from a Lost Generation, it was dramatised by Mark Bostridge and starred Amanda Root as Vera Brittain and Rupert Graves as Roland Leighton.

In 2009, it was announced that the feature film Testament of Youth was in development by BBC Films and Heyday Films producer David Heyman, and was to be directed by James Kent; this had the support of the Vera Brittain Estate, Brittain's daughter Shirley Williams, and Brittain's biographer Mark Bostridge who acted as a consultant. The film was released in late 2014 as part of the First World War commemorations. The film stars Alicia Vikander as Vera Brittain, with Kit Harington as Roland Leighton.

== Criticism ==
A book by Brittain's biographer and editor Mark Bostridge, entitled Vera Brittain and the First World War: The Story of Testament of Youth was published by Bloomsbury in December 2014. It looks at early versions of the book in the wake of the new film adaptation.

== See also ==
- Anti-war movement
- Feminism in the United Kingdom
- Opposition to World War I

== Other sources ==
- The making of a peacenik Mark Bostridge, The Guardian 30 August 2003. Brittain's biographer reviews Testament of Youth. Accessed May 2008
- Testament of Youth, Vera Brittain's Literary Quest for Peace By Linda S. Coleman Popular Press (1997). Accessed June 2008
- Badenhausen, Richard (2003). "Mourning through Memoir: Trauma, Testimony, and Community in Vera Brittain's Testament of Youth". Twentieth Century Literature. 49. Archived from the original on 13 October 2012 – via Questia.
- "James Kent's Testament of Youth". The Oxford Student. 7 May 2015.
