= Testament of Youth (film) =

- UK theatrical release poster
- Directed by: James Kent
- Written by: Juliette Towhidi
- Based on: Testament of Youth by Vera Brittain
- Produced by: Rosie Alison; David Heyman
- Starring: Alicia Vikander; Kit Harington; Taron Egerton; Emily Watson; Hayley Atwell; Colin Morgan; Joanna Scanlan; Anna Chancellor; Alexandra Roach; Dominic West; Miranda Richardson
- Cinematography: Rob Hardy
- Edited by: Lucia Zucchetti
- Music by: Max Richter
- Production companies: BBC Films; Heyday Films; Screen Yorkshire; BFI; Hotwells Productions; Nordisk Film Production; Lipsync; Ingenious Media; Protagonist Pictures
- Distributed by: Lionsgate
- Release dates: 14 October 2014 (BFI); 16 January 2015
- Running time: 129 minutes
- Country: United Kingdom
- Language: English
- Budget: $10 million
- Box office: $5.3 million

Testament of Youth is a 2014 British drama film based on the First World War memoir of the same name written by Vera Brittain. The film stars Alicia Vikander as Vera Brittain, an independent young woman who abandoned her studies at Somerville College, Oxford, to become a war nurse. The film was directed by James Kent and written by Juliette Towhidi. The film marks Taron Egerton's film debut.

== Plot ==
In 1914, Vera Brittain wants to escape her traditional family in Buxton by attending Oxford University with her younger brother Edward and his friends at Uppingham School, Roland Leighton and Victor Richardson. Despite her father's opposition, she passes the entrance examination for Somerville College, Oxford. Before enrolling at Oxford, Vera and Roland, who shares Vera's interest in writing and poetry, begin a romance, although she knows that Victor is in love with her.

After the assassination of Archduke Franz Ferdinand and the start of the First World War, Vera helps to persuade her father to allow Edward to join the army instead of studying at Oxford; Roland and Victor also join, and Roland is the first to reach the Western Front. As long lists of casualties appear in newspapers, Vera leaves Oxford to volunteer for the Voluntary Aid Detachment as a nurse tending the wounded in a hospital in England.

Although his friends still see the war as exciting, Roland tells Vera of his traumatic experiences from trench warfare at the front. He proposes to Vera; they decide to marry during his next home leave. Roland returns to France, now with Edward. Roland writes in late 1915 that he has been granted leave and is safe away from the front. As Vera awaits his arrival during the Christmas holiday, Roland's mother tells her on the telephone that he has been killed.

The army tells Vera and Roland's family that he died "a noble and painless death." After she demands the truth, George Catlin, who saw the wounded Roland in Louvencourt, admits that Roland died in agonising pain from his abdominal gunshot wound. When Victor, blind from his injuries, arrives at Vera's hospital, she proposes to him because he is "going to need someone and I... well, Roland would like it," but he gently turns her down before suddenly dying from his head injury.

In 1917, Vera asks to transfer to France to be closer to Edward, but her first assignment is to treat wounded Germans. She is reluctant, but learns that they suffer and die like English soldiers. Vera finds Edward among the dying and helps save his life. He shows her a letter from his "dear friend" Geoffrey Thurlow, implying the two men were lovers. After Edward's recovery, she is glad that he is sent to the safer Italian Front. Edward insists that Vera return to her Oxford studies after the war. Vera returns home after her mother has a nervous breakdown. She sees a telegram being delivered and learns, from her father's weeping, that Edward has died.

In 1918, having lost all the young men closest to her, Vera cannot celebrate as crowds cheer the Armistice with Germany. Back at Oxford, she has nightmares about Roland's and Edward's deaths. Winifred Holtby, another student at the college, helps Vera cope with her trauma.

Vera attends a public meeting where speakers debate how to punish Germany for the war. Most of the audience is against George Catlin, who warns that "the philosophy of 'an eye for an eye'" could cause another war. Vera confesses her guilt over persuading her father to let Edward join the army, and tells of how she held the hand of a dying German soldier, who was no different from her brother or her fiancé. She says that their deaths have meaning "only if we stand together now and say 'No' to war and revenge."

Now a pacifist, Vera promises her dead men that she will not forget them. The film ends with a dedication to the dead.

The plot of the film broadly follows the narrative of the book, but it does deviate in two significant ways: George Catlin, who entered the army in 1918, never met Roland, who died in 1915. In addition, Vera did not help save her brother Edward's life after he was wounded at the Somme in 1916; he was simply sent to the First London General Hospital, where she was a volunteer nurse. Also, as Roland departs for the war in 1915, news of the Spanish flu is mentioned, yet the pandemic was not openly acknowledged until 1918.

== Cast and crew gallery ==
Principal actors, director and producer

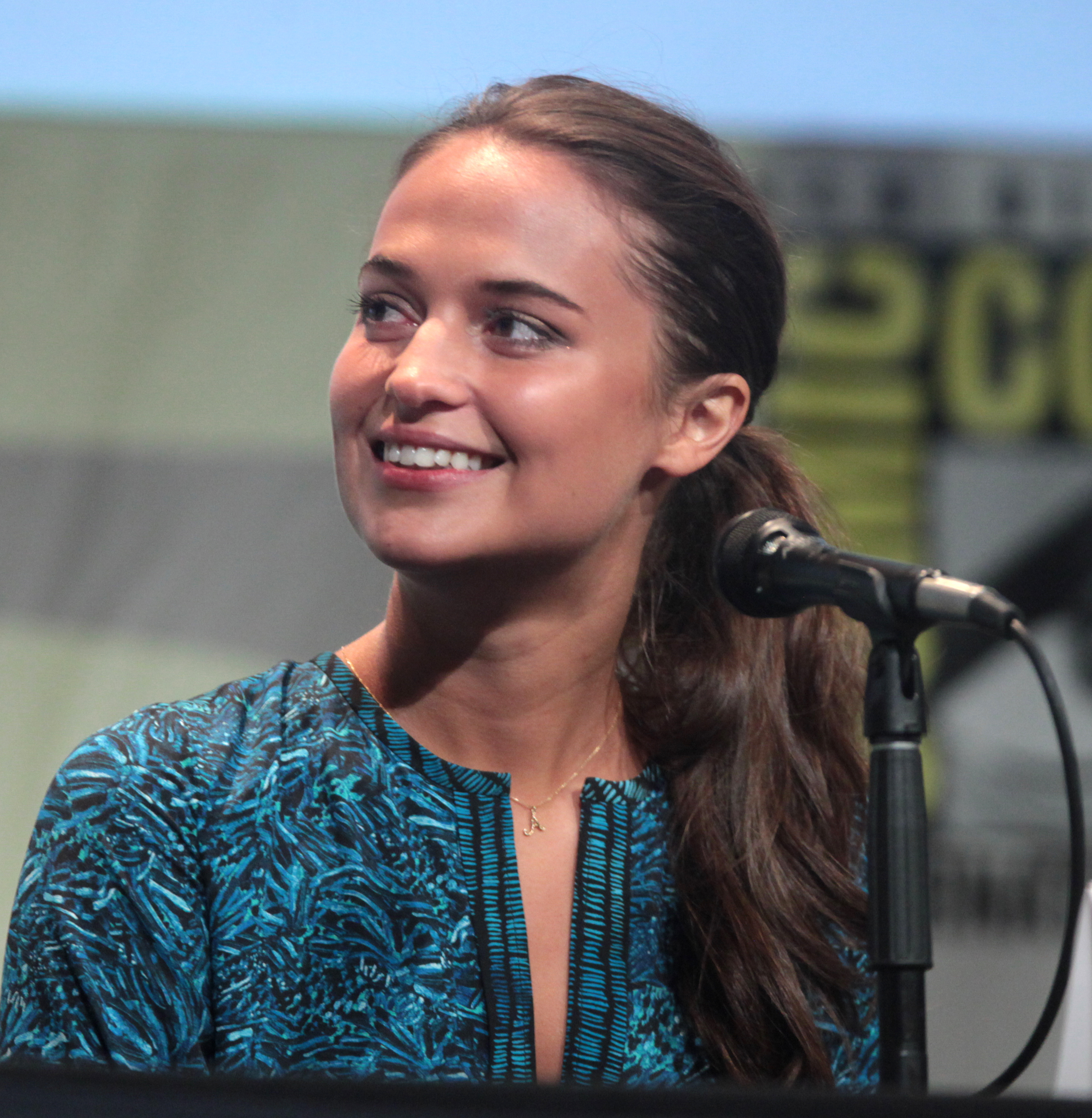
Alicia Vikander

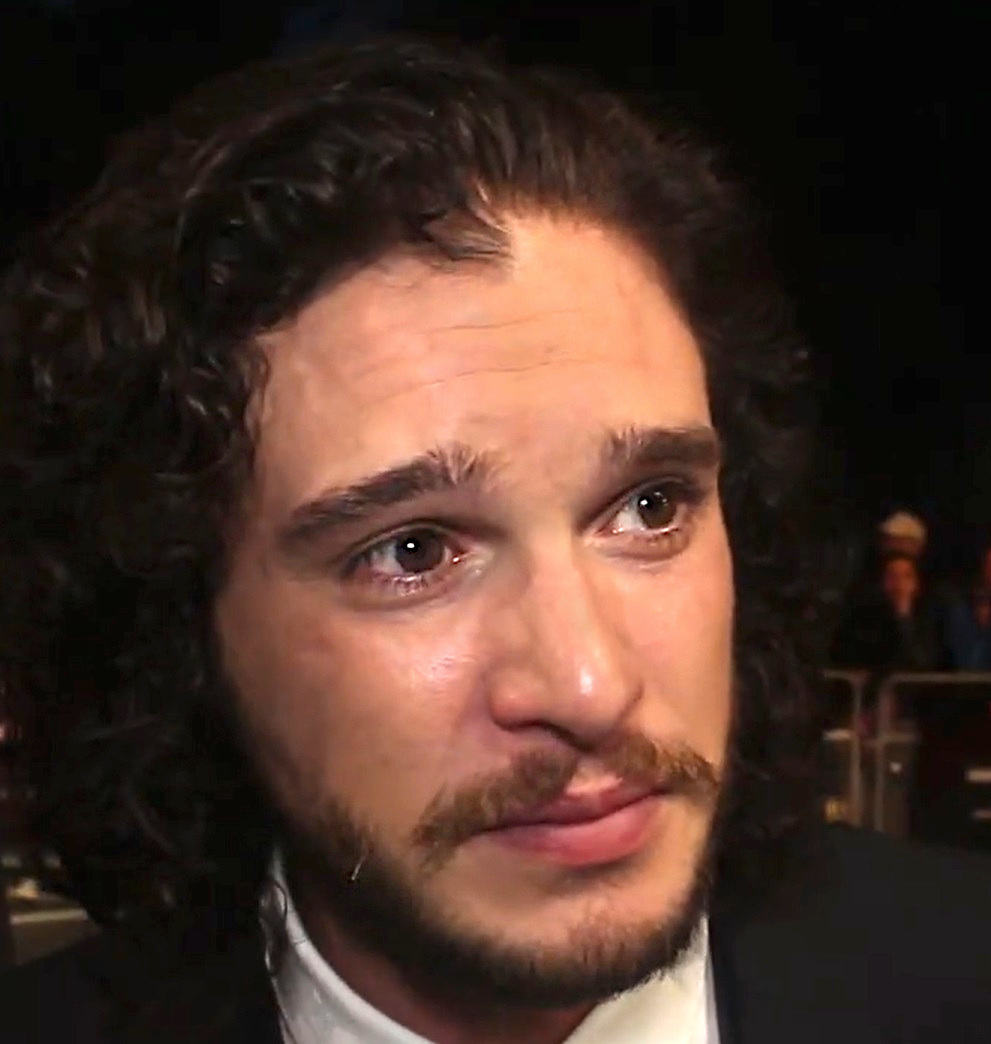
Kit Harington

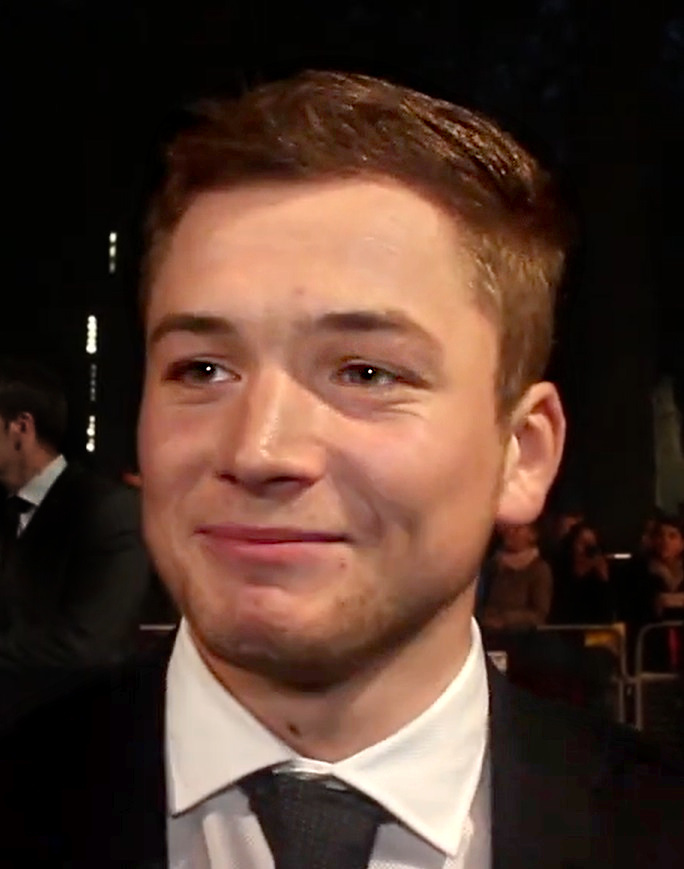
Taron Egerton

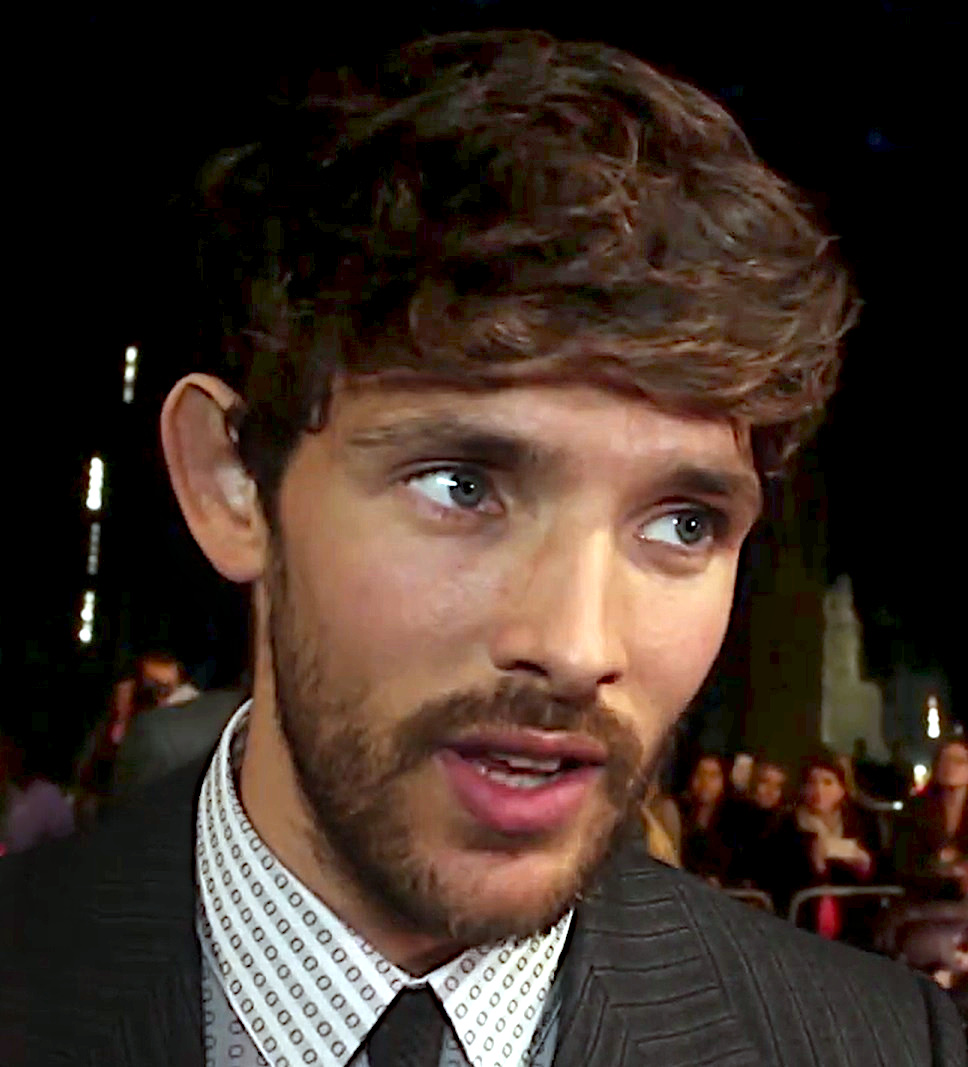
Colin Morgan

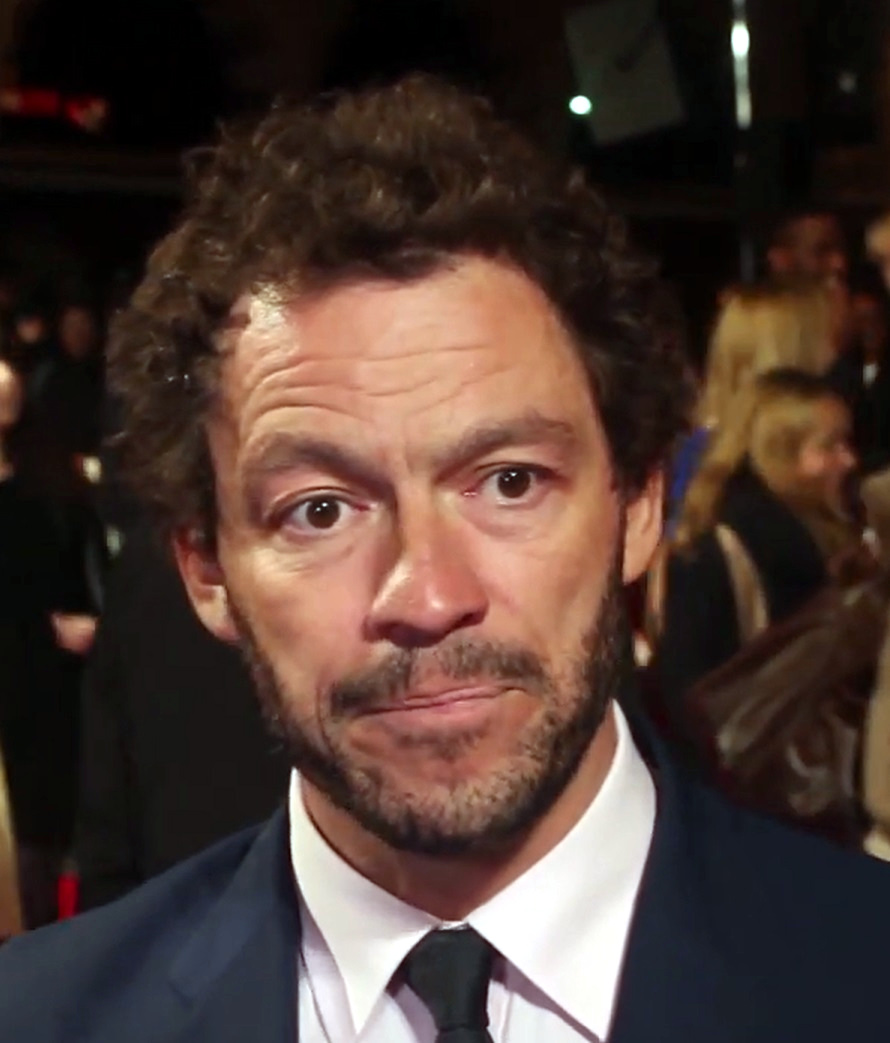
Dominic West

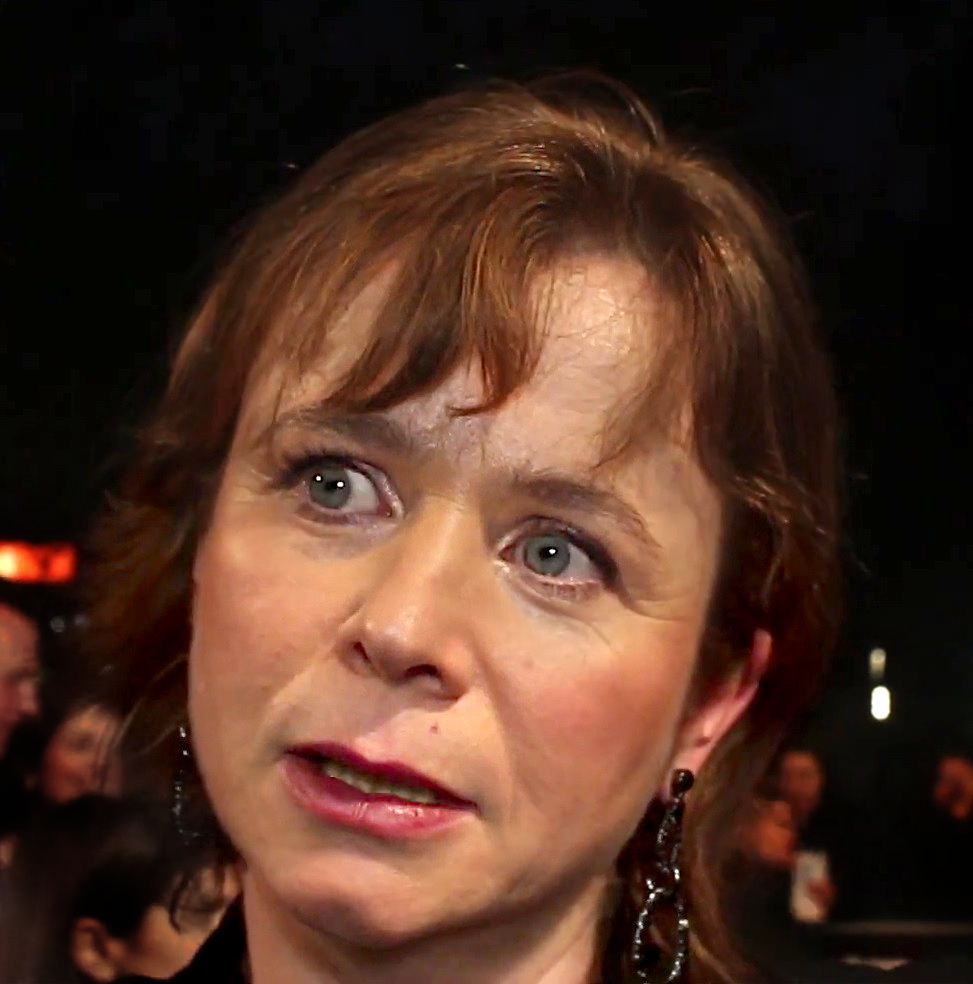
Emily Watson

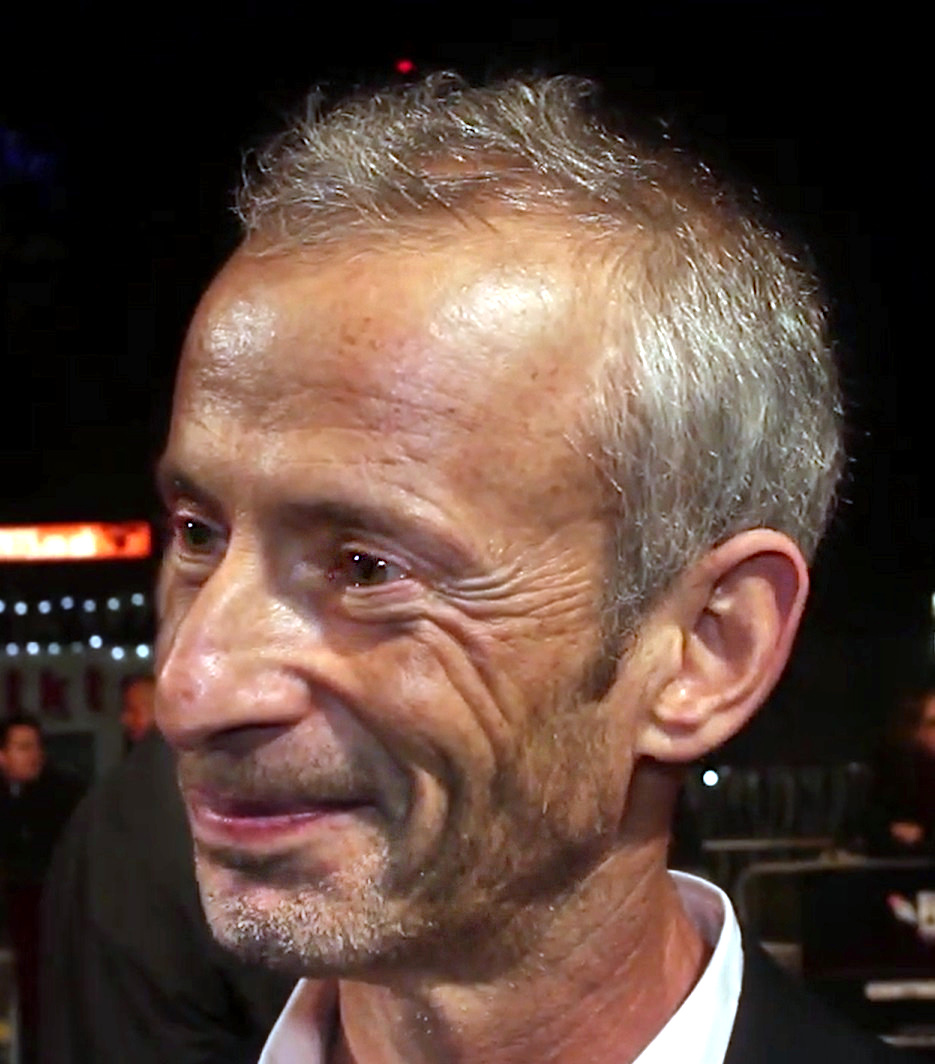
James Kent (director)

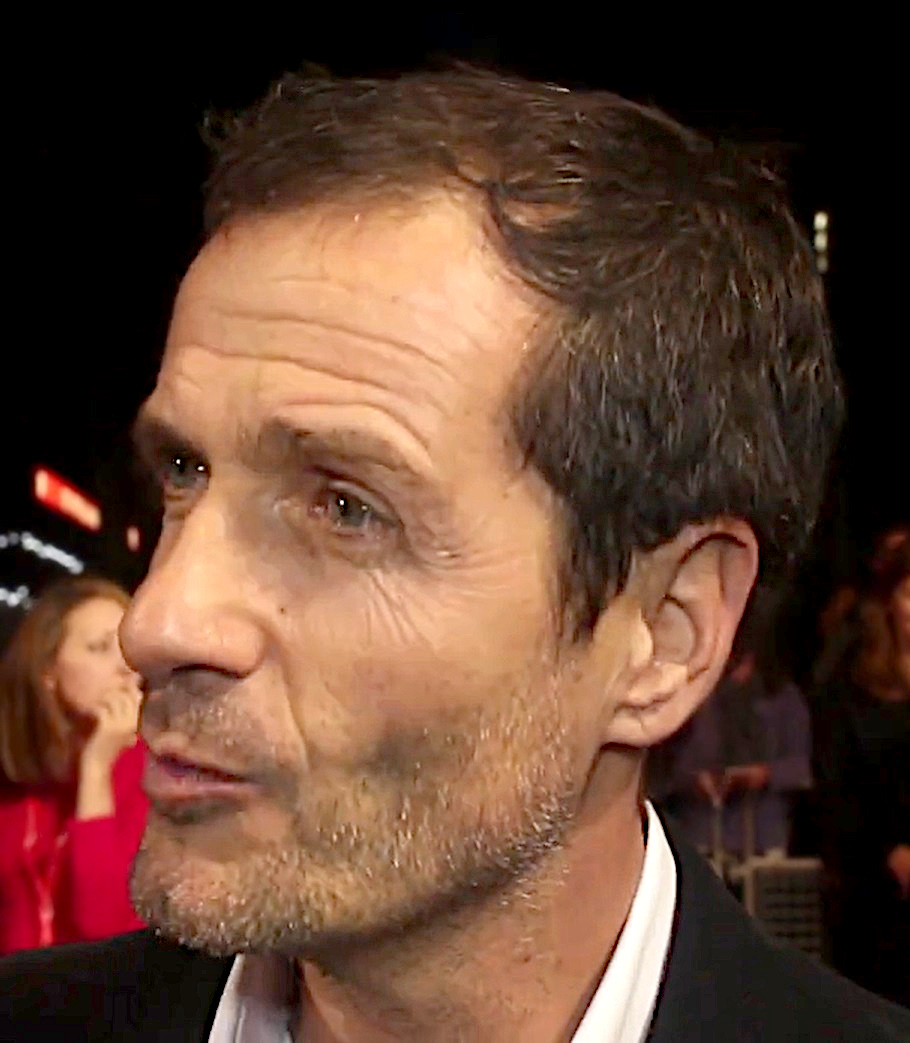
David Heyman (producer)

== Cast ==
- Alicia Vikander as Vera Brittain
- Kit Harington as Roland Leighton
- Colin Morgan as Victor Richardson
- Taron Egerton as Edward Brittain
- Dominic West as Mr Brittain
- Emily Watson as Mrs Brittain
- Joanna Scanlan as Aunt Belle
- Hayley Atwell as Hope
- Jonathan Bailey as Geoffrey Thurlow
- Alexandra Roach as Winifred Holtby
- Anna Chancellor as Mrs Leighton
- Miranda Richardson as Miss Lorimer
- Charlotte Hope as Betty
- Daisy Waterstone as Clare Leighton

== Production ==
In February 2009, it was announced that BBC Films was developing a feature film adaptation of memoir Testament of Youth written by Vera Brittain, about women's experiences during the Great War. The BBC had already adapted the book as a five-part television serial which was transmitted on BBC2 in 1979 with Cheryl Campbell as Vera Brittain.

Film development had the support of Shirley Williams, Brittain's daughter and of Mark Bostridge, Brittain's biographer, editor and one of her literary executors, who was reportedly acting as consultant on the film. Heyday Films' producers David Heyman and Rosie Alison would be producing the film with the BBC, while Juliette Towhidi was adapting the film. On 4 February 2014 Protagonist Pictures came on board to handle international sales and launched the film at the Berlin International Film Festival in that month.

=== Casting ===
Saoirse Ronan was initially attached to play Brittain. On 4 February 2014, Kit Harington joined the cast to play the role of Brittain's fiancé Roland Leighton. On 13 February 2014, Colin Morgan, Alexandra Roach and Taron Egerton were announced to have joined the film's cast. An ensemble cast was confirmed as filming began, including Dominic West, Emily Watson, Joanna Scanlan, Hayley Atwell, Jonathan Bailey and Anna Chancellor.

=== Filming ===
Principal photography began on 16 March 2014 in London, Oxford and Yorkshire, including a number of locations across the North York Moors. It substituted Merton College, Oxford in the scenes showing Brittain's time as a student at Somerville College, arguing that filming in Somerville itself would have been too difficult in light of the new buildings constructed there since the film's time period.

The railway station scenes, the train interiors, and the scene in the railway cafe, were shot at Keighley railway station, using trains provided by the Keighley and Worth Valley Railway. The landscape shots of period trains were filmed at the heritage track of the North Yorkshire Moors Railway. Ravenscar and Robin Hood's Bay in the North York Moors were locations for the coastal shots. The Welbeck Abbey estate in Nottinghamshire provided several locations, including the scenes at Uppingham School, Melrose House and the Étaples field hospital. The lake scenes were filmed in Darley Dale in Derbyshire. Hospital corridor scenes were filmed in Sheffield Town Hall.

To portray the war-blinded Victor Richardson, Morgan interviewed a series of ex-service men and women; he contacted Blind Veterans UK and spent a day at the charity's Brighton Centre, where he received the same training as blind veterans, while blindfolded.

=== Music ===
The musical score was composed by Max Richter, after taking over for Mark Bradshaw who was previously attached.

== Distribution ==
=== Marketing ===
The first trailer was released on 1 August 2014. The second trailer was then released on 10 November 2014.

A book by Mark Bostridge, titled Vera Brittain and the First World War: The Story of Testament of Youth, was published by Bloomsbury Publishing on 4 December 2014. The book includes a chapter on the making of the film.

=== Theatrical release ===
The film was released in wide distribution in the UK on 16 January 2015. Its world premiere was in The Centrepiece Gala, supported by the Mayor of London, at the British Film Institute London Film Festival on 14, 16 and 17 October 2014. On 16 January 2015, Sony Pictures Classics acquired the distribution rights to the film for North America, Latin America and Asia from Protagonist Pictures. The film was released in the USA on 5 June 2015 and in France on 24 June 2015.

== Reception ==
=== Critical response ===
Testament of Youth was well received upon its release. Review aggregator Rotten Tomatoes reports that 84% of 125 film critics have given the film a positive review, with an average rating of 7/10. The website's critics consensus reads, "Testament of Youth is well-acted and beautifully filmed, adding up to an enriching if not adventurous experience for fans of British period dramas." Metacritic, which assigns a weighted average score out of 100 to reviews from mainstream critics, gives the film a score of 77 based on 34 reviews. Audiences surveyed by CinemaScore gave the film an average grade of "B" on an A+ to F scale.

=== Awards and nominations ===
Year	Award	Category	Nominee(s)	Result	Ref
2014	British Independent Film Awards	Best Actress	Alicia Vikander	Nominated	
2014	London Film Festival	Best British Newcomer	Taron Egerton	Nominated	
2015	London Critics Circle Film Awards	Breakthrough British Filmmaker	James Kent	Nominated	
2016	Alliance of Women Film Journalists	Best Breakthrough Performance	Alicia Vikander	Won	
