= Edward Brittain =

British Army officer (1895–1918)

Edward Brittain MC
- Born: Edward Harold Brittain; 30 November 1895; Macclesfield, Cheshire, England
- Died: 15 June 1918 (aged 22); Piave River, Asiago, Italy
- Burial place: Granezza British Cemetery, Italy; 45.80775°N 11.53167°E
- Military career
- Allegiance: United Kingdom
- Branch: British Army
- Rank: Captain
- Unit: Sherwood Foresters
- Conflicts: First World War: Western Front; Battle of the Somme; Italian Front; Second Battle of the Piave River †

Edward Harold Brittain, MC (30 November 1895 – 15 June 1918) was a British Army officer who was killed in the First World War; he was immortalised by his sister Vera Brittain in Testament of Youth.

== Early life ==
Brittain was born at Macclesfield, Cheshire, to paper manufacturer Thomas Arthur Brittain (1864–1935) and his wife Edith Bervon Brittain (1868–1948). His only sibling was his older sister Vera, to whom he was very close. Brittain was educated at Uppingham School, where he made two close friends, Roland Leighton and Victor Richardson. Brittain was a good student, though seldom a prizewinner, at Uppingham and also served in the Officers' Training Corps. A talented violinist, he hoped to become a composer, but his father expected him to enter either the family paper-making firm or the Civil Service.

== First World War ==
Brittain left school in July 1914, just before the First World War broke out. He had been admitted to New College, Oxford, but after the outbreak of hostilities he joined the British Army and was commissioned as a temporary second lieutenant into the Sherwood Foresters (Nottinghamshire and Derbyshire Regiment) on 19 November 1914. He remained in England for the first year and a half of the war; he was held back from several transfers to the front by his colonel who was not impressed by Edward's supercilious attitude. During this period, he became close friends with fellow officer Geoffrey Thurlow. Leighton, who had been serving on the Western Front, died of wounds in December 1915, and soon afterwards, in early 1916, Brittain was posted to the Western Front. He was wounded in the left arm and the right thigh in the Battle of the Somme on 1 July 1916. Lieutenant Brittain was sent to First London General Hospital, where his sister was then working as a V.A.D. nurse. He was subsequently awarded the Military Cross for his service on the Somme. The citation stated that Brittain was awarded the M.C. "For conspicuous gallantry and leadership during an attack. He was severely wounded, but continued to lead his men with great bravery and coolness until a second wound disabled him."

Brittain remained in England, recuperating and then on light duty, until 30 June 1917. Thurlow was killed in action at Monchy-le-Preux in April 1917; Richardson was blinded at Arras the same month, and died from a cerebral abscess in London in June 1917. These losses transformed Brittain, in his sister's words, into "an unfamiliar, frightening Edward, who never smiled or spoke except about trivial things ... Silent, uncommunicative, thrust in upon himself." Brittain returned to the Western Front almost exactly a year after he had left it and was immediately sent into battle, without knowing either the terrain or the men he was commanding, but emerged unscathed. His letters became increasingly critical of the conduct of the war. Vera Brittain was posted to a British hospital in northern France in August 1917, but the siblings never managed to see each other in France.

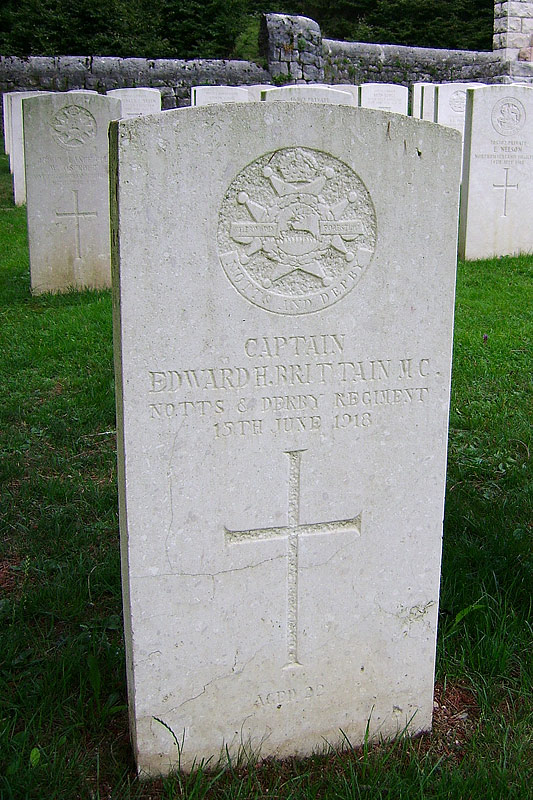
Brittain's CWGC headstone in Granezza British Cemetery

Brittain was made a temporary captain in August 1917 and was sent to the Italian Front with the 11th Sherwood Foresters in November 1917. He saw his family for the last time on leave in January 1918. On 15 June 1918 on the Asiago Plateau, Captain Brittain was shot in the head and killed during an early morning counter-attack against an Austrian offensive, part of the Battle of the Piave River.

In June 1918, army censors had read a letter from Brittain that indicated he had had homosexual relations with men in his company. His commanding officer, Lieutenant Colonel Charles Hudson, was notified that Brittain would be court-martialled when he came out of the line. Hudson was told not to warn Brittain, but he warned him obliquely anyway. His commanding officer believed that Brittain put himself in harm's way to avoid a court martial and the shame that this would bring upon his family. Edward's mother later revealed to Vera that Edward had been involved in homosexual activities while at Uppingham. Hudson evaded Vera Brittain's questions when she visited him in hospital in 1918, but told her of his suspicions after Testament of Youth was published in 1933. She was initially reluctant to believe that her brother had deliberately exposed himself to danger but eventually came around to his colonel's interpretation of events and fictionalised them in her novel Honourable Estate. While researching the authorised biography of Vera Brittain, Mark Bostridge tracked down Hudson's son Miles and was permitted to read Hudson's account of Edward Brittain's last days. In 1995 Bostridge published details of his discovery in Vera Brittain: A Life, a book of which he and Paul Berry were the authors.

== Legacy ==
Edward Brittain is buried in Granezza British Cemetery on the Asiago Plateau in Italy. In September 1921 Vera Brittain visited the cemetery with Winifred Holtby, and her will requested that her ashes be scattered on his grave; "for nearly 50 years much of my heart has been in that Italian village cemetery". Her daughter Shirley Williams honoured her request in September 1970.

Edward Brittain is commemorated along with Victor Richardson and Roland Leighton on the war memorial at St Barnabas Church, Hove; this was the church attended by the Richardson family.

Many of Brittain's letters are published in Letters from a Lost Generation: First World War Letters of Vera Brittain and Four Friends (Little, Brown, 1998, Alan Bishop and Mark Bostridge, eds.). His musical setting to his friend Leighton's poem "L'Envoi" is published in Testament of Youth (New York: Penguin, 1989), 78–80.

In the 1979 television adaptation of Testament of Youth he was played by Rupert Frazer, with Cheryl Campbell taking the part of Vera. In the BBC Radio 4 adaptation of Letters from a Lost Generation in 1998, Jonathan Firth took the role of Edward Brittain. In the 2014 film of Testament of Youth he was portrayed by Taron Egerton.

In Toby's Room, a novel by Pat Barker, published in 2012, the fate of the central character of Toby is based on that of Edward Brittain, though the source material is neither cited nor acknowledged.

In the 2018 BBC Radio 4 programme Edward Brittain and the Forgotten Front, Baroness Williams followed the footsteps of her mother to the grave of her uncle.

On 7 July 2023, Buxton Festival staged the first of a run of performances of The Land of Might-Have-Been, a musical show drawing on existing songs by Ivor Novello, presenting a fictionalised version of Vera Brittain's life in 1914 and 1915, and exploring her relationships with her fiancé Roland, Edward, and Edward's (fictional) gay lover Bobbie Jones, and the impact the war had on them.
