= Testament of Youth (TV series) =

1979 British television drama series

- Genre: Drama
- Based on: Testament of Youth by Vera Brittain
- Screenplay by: Elaine Morgan
- Directed by: Moira Armstrong
- Starring: Cheryl Campbell; Peter Woodward; Joanna McCallum; Emrys James; Jane Wenham; Rosalie Crutchley
- Theme music composer: Geoffrey Burgon
- Country of origin: United Kingdom
- Original language: English
- No. of series: 1
- No. of episodes: 5

Production
- Producer: Jonathan Powell
- Running time: 275 minutes
- Production companies: BBC, London Film Productions

Original release
- Network: BBC
- Release: 4 November – 2 December 1979

Testament of Youth is a 1979 five-part BBC television drama based on the First World War memoir of the same name written by Vera Brittain. It was transmitted on BBC2.

The series stars Cheryl Campbell as Vera Brittain, an independent young woman from Buxton, Derbyshire, who abandons her studies at Somerville College, Oxford University to become a volunteer nurse. It features Peter Woodward as Roland Leighton, Joanna McCallum as Winifred Holtby and Emrys James and Jane Wenham as Vera's parents.

The series won five British Academy Television Awards (BAFTA), including for Best Drama Series or Serial. As well as her BAFTA, Campbell received a Best Actress award from the Broadcasting Press Guild. Elaine Morgan was honoured with the Writer of the Year award from the Royal Television Society for her serialisation.

== Cast ==
- Cheryl Campbell as Vera Brittain
- Emrys James as Mr Brittain
- Jane Wenham as Mrs Brittain
- Peter Woodward as Roland Leighton
- Rupert Frazer as Edward Brittain
- Rosalie Crutchley as Miss Penrose
- Michael Troughton as Victor Richardson
- Geoffrey Burridge as Geoffrey Thurlow
- Frances Tomelty as Sister Hope Milroy
- Jane Booker as Nurse Sally
- Tricia George as Betty
- Joanna Foster as Theresa
- June Tobin as Mrs Leighton
- Victor Lucas as Mr Leighton
- Joanna McCallum as Winifred Holtby

== See also ==
- Testament of Youth (film)
