= Bostridge =

Bostridge is a surname of English origin. Notable people with the surname include:

- Ian Bostridge (born 1964), English tenor
- Mark Bostridge (active from 1995), British writer and critic
