= James Kent (director) =

British television and film director

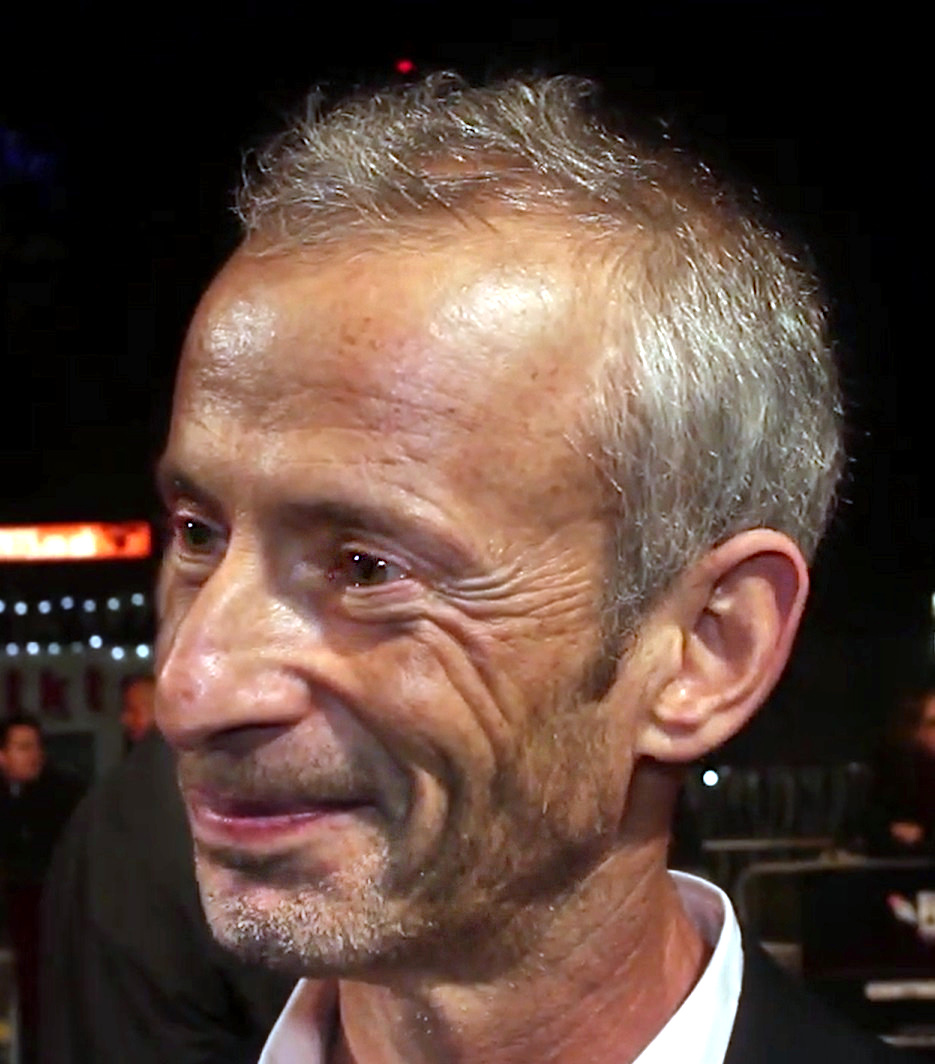
James Kent at Testament of Youth - World Premiere in 2014

James Kent is a British television and film director. He directed the feature films Testament of Youth and The Aftermath and the TV dramas The White Queen and The Secret Diaries of Miss Anne Lister. He has also directed many documentaries, notably Chopin Saved My Life, 9/11: Phone Calls from the Towers and Holocaust: A Music Memorial Film from Auschwitz. He was nominated for the Breakthrough British Filmmaker award at the 2014 London Film Critics Circle Awards. Productions he has directed have been nominated for Golden Globe and Grierson awards and have won BAFTA and International Emmy awards.

== Early life ==
Kent was born and grew up in Yorkshire. He was educated at Bootham School, a Quaker institution, and at Oxford University.

== Career ==
Kent's first job was as a BBC local news journalist in Bristol. He has since directed more than 20 documentaries for the BBC. The subjects of his documentaries have included Albert Camus, Philip Larkin, John Osborne, Gianni Versace, Mozart and photography.

His directorial break in fiction came on EastEnders, helming three episodes which aired in January 2000. He later made a docudrama about Elizabeth David, with Catherine McCormack in the lead. In an interview in 2015, he recalled, "Panned in The Times, Elizabeth David got me offers from three agents and it was time to either take the plunge or say goodbye to drama." Since then his directing credits include Marchlands, Inside Men, The White Queen and the Richard Gere vehicle MotherFatherSon. In 2016 he directed for the television series 11.22.63.

In 2014, Kent made his debut as a feature film director with Testament of Youth, an adaptation of Vera Brittain's memoir of the First World War, which starred Alicia Vikander and Kit Harington. His second feature film was The Aftermath, which was based on Rhidian Brook's novel of that name and starred Keira Knightley. In 2022 he directed a film of Francis Poulenc’s opera La Voix Humaine for the BBC and Royal Opera House. He was also lead director of the second season of The Capture, the BBC's hit surveillance thriller starring Holliday Grainger and directed the central episodes of Showtime’s much-lauded Fellow Travelers. He directed Lost Boys and Fairies for the BBC, a three-part 2024 Bafta nominated drama about gay adoption in Wales.
