= Victor Richardson (British Army officer) =

Officer, Great War Death (1895–1917)

- Born: 18 March 1895; Hove, England, United Kingdom
- Died: 9 June 1917 (aged 22); Chelsea, London, England, United Kingdom
- Cause of death: Died of wounds (cerebral abscess)
- Education: Uppingham School
- Occupation: British soldier

Victor Richardson MC (18 March 1895 – 9 June 1917) was a British Army officer who served during the Great War, best remembered for being immortalised in his friend Vera Brittain's First World War best-selling 1933 memoir Testament of Youth.

== Life and work ==
Richardson was born in Hove, East Sussex as the elder son of dental surgeon Frank Victor Richardson and his wife, Emily Caroline. He was educated at Uppingham School where he met Edward Brittain and Roland Leighton. They were described by Leighton's mother as the "Three Musketeers". Edward later introduced Richardson to his sister, Vera Brittain, who became a close friend and confidante, particularly after the death of Roland Leighton. He is most remembered as "Tar" or "Tah" from Vera Brittain's Testament of Youth and Chronicle of Youth, and whose correspondence was also featured in Letters from a Lost Generation. First World War Letters of Vera Brittain and Four Friends.

The three boys joined the Officers' Training Corps (OTC). A fellow schoolboy at Uppingham, C. R. W. Nevinson, described the mood of the school as "appalling jingoism". Nevinson complained that because he did not share this patriotism, he was "kicked, hounded, caned, flogged, hair-brushed, morning, noon and night. The more I suffered, the less I cared. The longer I stayed, the harder I grew." The headmaster told them on Speech Day that "If a man can't serve his country he's better dead".

Richardson, whose ambition was to become a doctor, won a place at Emmanuel College, Cambridge. Soon after the outbreak of the First World War in August 1914, Richardson abandoned his studies to join the army and was commissioned as a second lieutenant with the Royal Sussex Regiment on 5 October 1914. While training in Horsham in January 1915, he caught meningitis and was sent to a hospital in Brighton. He was promoted a temporary lieutenant on 4 July 1915.

In September 1916, Richardson transferred to the 9th King's Royal Rifle Corps and was sent to the Western Front. He wrote to Vera Brittain on 31 October, describing life in the front-line trenches; "It was very quiet and without much excitement. We did not get any heavy shells at all till the last day when a couple of 5.9s amused themselves at our expense for about half-an-hour, but without doing any damage. Whizz-Bangs – about which one has heard so much – are perfectly harmless in a trench, as the trajectory is so flat that it is nearly impossible for them to land in a trench. There is practically no rifle or machine gun fire and what there is appears to be unaimed – fixed rifles and swinging traverses for the most."

Richardson admitted that the situation would change when he had to take part in the fighting; "I have so far come across nothing more gruesome than a few very dead Frenchman in No Man's Land, so cannot give you very thrilling descriptions. The thing one appreciates in the life here more than anything else is the truly charming spirit of good fellowship and freedom from pettiness that prevails everywhere."

In January 1917, Richardson was sent to the 3rd Army School. Edward Brittain pointed out that he "has the courtesy title of Captain while he is there and has to wear Captain's badges; it is a most curious thing and I have never heard of an instance of it before." The following month, he was back on the front-line. He told Vera Brittain that he expected to be involved in the planned major offensive that would end the war and hoped that he would "not come down at the last fence."

Richardson was badly wounded during an attack at Arras on 9 April 1917. It was later reported that he "was leading his platoon was hit in the arm but took his coat off had the wound bandaged and went on; it was at the 2nd German line that he got the bullet through his head and the Colonel himself gave him morphia because he was in pain." His commanding officer wrote to his parents; "You have good reason to be proud of him... he did his best and it was a good best too. I have sent his name in for the Military Cross and I have no doubt that he will get it."

Richardson was sent back to London where he received specialist treatment at No. 2 London General Hospital in St. Mark's College, Chelsea. Edward Brittain visited him in hospital, and then wrote to his sister, Vera, about his condition: "It is not known yet whether Victor will die or not, but his left eye was removed in France and the specialist who saw him thinks it is almost certain that the sight of the right eye has gone too... The bullet – probably from a machine-gun – went in just behind the left eye and went very slightly upwards but not I'm afraid enough to clear the right eye; the bullet is not yet out though very close to the right edge of the temple; it is expected that it will work through of its own accord... We are told that he may remain in his present condition for a week. I don't think he will die suddenly but of course the brain must be injured and it depends upon how bad the injury is. I am inclined to think it would be better that he should die; I would far rather die myself than lose all that we have most dearly loved, but I think we hardly bargained for this. Sight is really a more precious gift than life."

Vera Brittain decided to return home after the death of Geoffrey Thurlow (a close friend of Edward who she befriended also) and the serious injuries suffered by Richardson.

Edward Brittain went to visit Richardson and on 7 May he said to his sister: "He was told last Wednesday that he will probably never see again, but he is marvellously cheerful.... He is perfectly sensible in every way and I don't think there is the very least doubt that he will live. He said that the last few days had been rather bitter. He hasn't given up hope himself about his sight." At about this time Victor was visited by an officer from the St Dunstan's charity for blinded servicemen, and voiced his intention to learn Braille and enter the church.

Vera arrived in London on 28 May 1917 and she spent the next ten days at Richardson's bedside. Those close to Victor at the time felt that Vera intended to marry Victor, and devote her life to caring for him. As Bishop and Bostridge point out, "His mental faculties appeared to be in no way impaired. On 8 June, however, there was a sudden change in his condition. In the middle of the night he experienced a miniature explosion in the head, and subsequently became very distressed and disoriented. By the time his family reached the hospital Victor had become delirious."

Richardson died of a ruptured cerebral abscess on 9 June 1917. His posthumous award of the Military Cross was gazetted on 15 June. He was buried in his mother's grave, at the Hove Old Shoreham Road Cemetery. He is also remembered, along with Roland Leighton and Edward Brittain, on the war memorial at St Barnabas Church, Hove (this was the church attended by the Richardson family), and the Hove War Memorial, which is situated in the Hove public library foyer.

== Cultural legacy ==
Vera Brittain wrote about Richardson in her First World War best-selling 1933 memoir Testament of Youth, based in part on the diary she had kept during the war, later published as Chronicle of Youth. Richardson's letters to Vera Brittain were published in a book by Alan Bishop and Mark Bostridge called Letters from a Lost Generation.

Richardson was portrayed by Michael Troughton in the 1979 BBC2 television adaptation of Testament of Youth. He was also played by Colin Morgan in the 2014 film Testament of Youth, produced by BBC Films and Heyday Films.

== Sources ==
- Nevinson, C. R. W. (2007) [First published 1938], Paint and Prejudice, Teeling Press, ISBN 978-1406743500
- Stewart, Claire (2014), British Film Institute: Testament of Youth
- Berry, Paul; Bostridge, Mark. Vera Brittain: A Life (Chatto & Windus, 1995).
