= Louvencourt =

- Commune
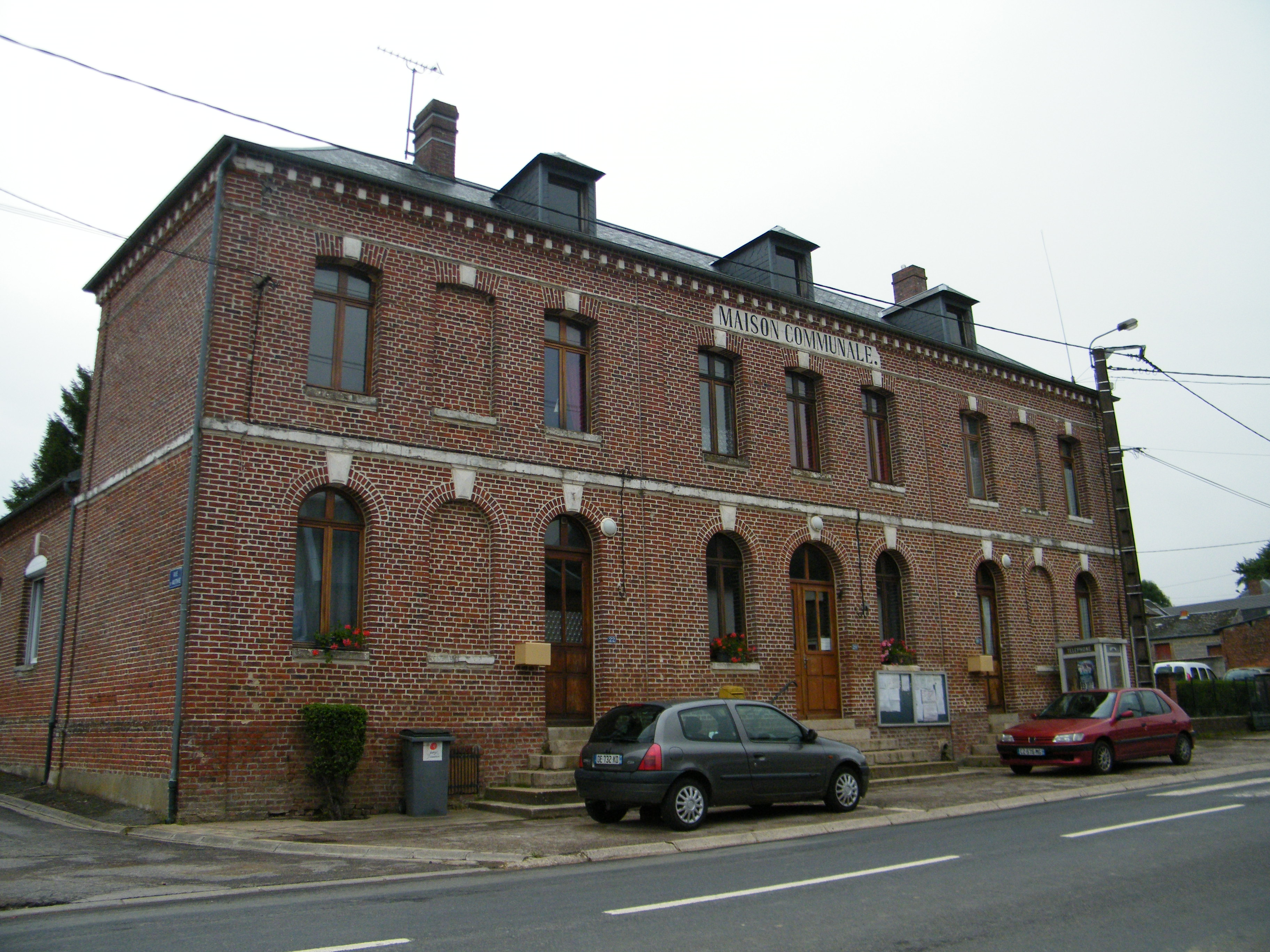
- The town hall in Louvencourt

- Coat of arms
- Location of Louvencourt
- Location within France Location within Hauts-de-France
- Coordinates: 50°05′40″N 2°30′00″E
- Country: France
- Region: Hauts-de-France
- Department: Somme
- Arrondissement: Péronne
- Canton: Albert
- Intercommunality: Pays du Coquelicot

Government
  - Mayor (2020–2026): Michèle Archelin
- Area^{1}: 7.74 km^{2} (2.99 sq mi)
- Elevation: 119 m (390 ft)
- Highest elevation: 152 m (499 ft)
- Lowest elevation: 95 m (312 ft)
- Population (2023): 289
  - Density: 37.3/km^{2} (96.7/sq mi)
- Time zone: UTC+01:00 (CET)
  - Summer (DST): UTC+02:00 (CEST)
- INSEE/Postal code: 80493 /80560
- ^{1} French Land Register data, which excludes lakes, ponds, glaciers > 1 km^{2} (0.386 sq mi or 247 acres) and river estuaries.

Louvencourt (French pronunciation: [luvɑ̃kuʁ]; Picard: Louvincourt) is a commune in the Somme department in Hauts-de-France in northern France. Vera Brittain's fiancée Roland Leighton is buried in the Louvencourt Commonwealth War Cemetery.

== Geography ==
Louvencourt is situated 16 miles (26 km) northeast of Amiens, on the D938 road.

== Population ==
Historical population
Year	Pop.	±% p.a.
1968	304	—
1975	306	+0.09%
1982	283	−1.11%
1990	259	−1.10%
1999	264	+0.21%
2007	263	−0.05%
2012	273	+0.75%
2017	281	+0.58%
2023	289	+0.47%
Source: INSEE

== See also ==
- Communes of the Somme department
