= The Aftermath (2019 film) =

2019 film directed by James Kent

- Theatrical release poster
- Directed by: James Kent
- Screenplay by: Joe Shrapnel; Anna Waterhouse
- Based on: The Aftermath; 2013 novel by Rhidian Brook
- Produced by: Jack Arbuthnott; Malte Grunert; Ridley Scott
- Starring: Keira Knightley; Alexander Skarsgård; Jason Clarke
- Cinematography: Franz Lustig
- Edited by: Beverley Mills
- Music by: Martin Phipps
- Production companies: Fox Searchlight Pictures; Amusement Park Films; Scott Free Productions; BBC Films
- Distributed by: Fox Searchlight Pictures
- Release dates: 26 February 2019 (GFF); 1 March 2019 (United Kingdom); 15 March 2019 (United States)
- Running time: 109 minutes
- Countries: United Kingdom; Germany; United States
- Languages: English; German
- Box office: $9.2 million

The Aftermath is a 2019 drama film directed by James Kent and written by Joe Shrapnel and Anna Waterhouse, based on the 2014 novel of the same name by Rhidian Brook. It stars Keira Knightley, Alexander Skarsgård and Jason Clarke. The film had its world premiere at the Glasgow Film Festival on 26 February 2019. It was released in the United States on 15 March 2019, by Fox Searchlight Pictures. It is the last Fox Searchlight Pictures film to be released before the acquisition of 21st Century Fox by Disney.

== Plot ==
The Aftermath is set in the British occupation zone in post-war Germany in 1945. Rachael Morgan arrives in the ruins of Hamburg in the bitter German winter to be reunited with her husband Lewis Morgan, a colonel of the British Army of the Rhine charged with rebuilding the shattered city under the Allied Control Council, and dealing with violent insurgent Werwolf activities. The couple, whose relationship is tense, stay in the requisitioned house of architect Stefan Lubert and his teenage daughter Freda Lubert. Lewis allows Stefan and Freda stay in the attic, a decision that Rachael is initially unhappy with because of her hatred of Germans due to her and Lewis' son Michael being killed during the Blitz. She is very rude to Stefan. Meanwhile, Freda becomes romantically involved with Bertie, a young Werwolf activist.

Rachael eventually bonds with Stefan over shared grief: his wife was killed by Allied bombing. They begin an affair. Despite her initial hostility to the Morgans, Freda and Rachael come to an understanding after discovering they both share a talent for the piano. The situation is complicated by British Forces Germany suspecting Stefan of Werwolf membership, though it is actually Bertie who is involved. Lewis realises Rachael and Stefan are having an affair when he learns of her advocating for Stefan to receive his Persilschein. When Lewis confronts Rachael, she tells him that she is leaving him to be with Stefan, who intends to move to a chalet in the Swiss Alps.

Bertie tries to assassinate Lewis but misses and kills Lewis's batman. Bertie flees across a frozen river but falls through the ice to his death. Stefan confronts Freda over her relationship with Bertie, which was motivated by her grief over the loss of her mother. After Stefan reaffirms his love for his daughter, the two reconcile. Meanwhile, Lewis tells Rachael to leave the next morning. After Lewis admits his grief over Michael to Rachael, she hugs him. She accompanies Stefan and Freda to the railway station, but decides to stay with Lewis instead of leaving with Stefan.

== Cast ==
- Keira Knightley as Rachael Morgan, Lewis’s wife
- Alexander Skarsgård as Stefan Lubert
- Jason Clarke as Colonel Lewis Morgan, Rachael’s husband
- Martin Compston as Keith Burnham
- Kate Phillips as Susan Burnham
- Flora Thiemann as Freda Lubert
- Jannik Schümann as Albert “Bertie”
- Fionn O'Shea as Major Barker
- Pip Torrens as General Brook
- Anna Katharina Schimrigk as Heike
- Alexander Scheer as Siegfried Leitmann

== Production ==
In August 2016, it was announced Fox Searchlight Pictures acquired the film, with Alexander Skarsgård and Keira Knightley, James Kent directing it from a screenplay by Joe Shrapnel and Anna Waterhouse, while Ridley Scott as a producer under his Scott Free Productions banner. That same month, Jason Clarke joined the cast of the film. In February 2017, Fionn O'Shea joined the cast.

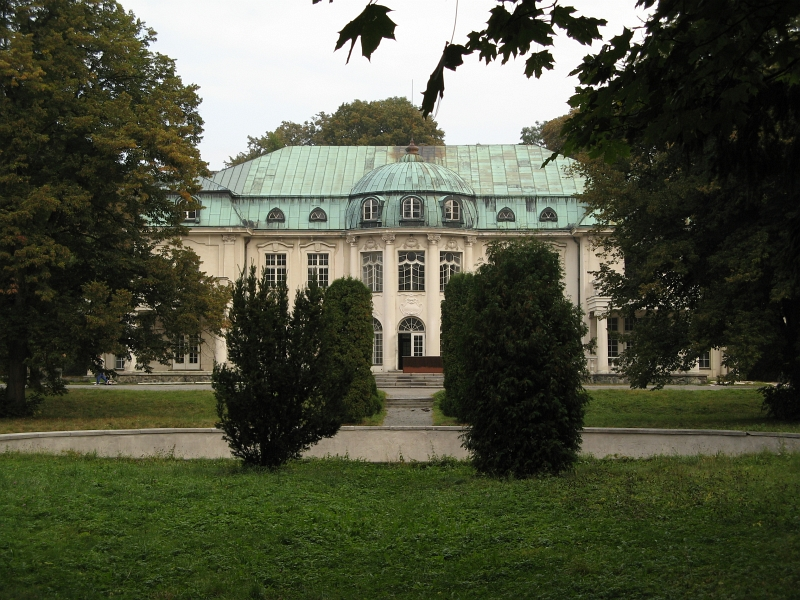
Slapy Castle, seen in 2008

Principal photography began in January 2017, in Prague, Czech Republic. Street scenes with bombed out buildings were filmed in a disused sugar factory there. Slapy Castle, just outside the city, doubled for Lubert's home.

== Home media ==
The Aftermath was released on DVD and Blu-ray on 11 June 2019.

== Reception ==
=== Box office ===
The Aftermath has grossed $9.2 million worldwide.

=== Critical response ===
The review aggregator Rotten Tomatoes, reported that 26% of critics have given the film a positive review based on 156 reviews, with an average rating of 5/10. The website's critics consensus reads, "Tasteful to a fault, The Aftermath is worth seeking out only for the most passionate period drama enthusiasts." On Metacritic, the film has a weighted average score of 43 out of 100 based on 33 critics, indicating "mixed or average reviews".
