= Vera Brittain =

English nurse and writer (1893–1970)

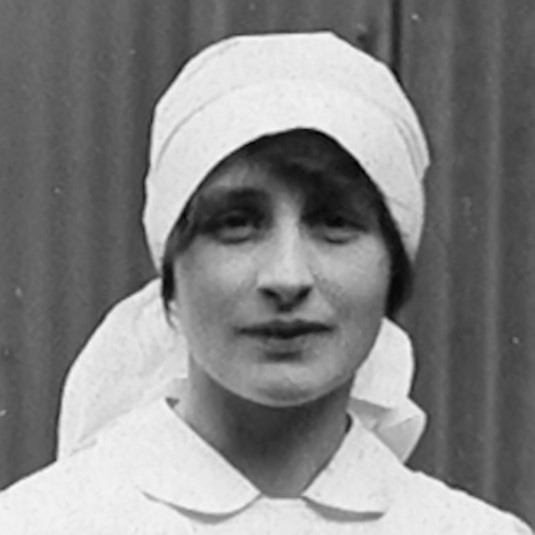
- Brittain shortly after the First World War
- Born: Vera Mary Brittain; 29 December 1893; Newcastle-under-Lyme, Staffordshire, England
- Died: 29 March 1970 (aged 76); Wimbledon, London, England
- Education: Somerville College, Oxford
- Occupations: Writer; Author; Journalist
- Spouse: Sir George Catlin (m. 1925)
- Children: John Brittain-Catlin; Shirley Williams
- Writing career
- Genres: Feminism; Pacifism
- Notable work: Testament of Youth (1933)

Vera Mary Brittain (29 December 1893 – 29 March 1970) was an English Voluntary Aid Detachment (VAD) nurse, writer, feminist, socialist and pacifist. Her best-selling 1933 memoir Testament of Youth recounted her experiences during the First World War and the beginning of her journey towards pacifism.

== Life and work ==
Born in Newcastle-under-Lyme, England, Vera Brittain was the daughter of a well-to-do paper manufacturer, (Thomas) Arthur Brittain (1864–1935) and his wife, Edith Mary (Bervon) Brittain (1868–1948). Her father was a director of family-owned paper mills in Hanley and Cheddleton. Her mother was born in Aberystwyth, Wales, the daughter of an impoverished musician, John Inglis Bervon.

When Brittain was 18 months old, her family moved to Macclesfield, Cheshire; 10 years later, in 1905, they moved again, to the spa town of Buxton in Derbyshire. As Brittain was growing up, her only sibling, brother, Edward, nearly two years her junior, was her closest companion. From the age of 13, she attended boarding-school at St Monica's, Kingswood, Surrey, where her mother's sister, Aunt Florence (Miss Bervon), was co-principal with Louise Heath-Jones, who had attended Newnham College, Cambridge.

After two years as a "provincial debutante", Brittain overcame her father's objections and went up to Somerville College, Oxford in 1914 to read English Literature, taught by Hilda Lorimer and others. By this time, war had broken out and Brittain had become close to Roland Leighton, one of her brother's friends from Uppingham School. Finding her Oxford studies increasingly an irrelevance as her male contemporaries volunteered for war, Brittain delayed her degree after one year in the summer of 1915 to work as a Voluntary Aid Detachment (VAD) nurse for much of the First World War. She served initially at the Devonshire Hospital in Buxton, and later in London, Malta and in France. While she was stationed close to the front at Étaples, her experience nursing German prisoners of war significantly influenced her journey towards internationalism and pacifism.

Roland Leighton, who became her fiancé in August 1915, close friends Victor Richardson, Geoffrey Thurlow, and finally her brother, Edward, were all killed in the war. Many of their letters to each other are reproduced in the book Letters from a Lost Generation. In one letter, Leighton speaks for his generation of public-school volunteers when he writes that he feels the need to play an "active part" in the war.

Returning to Oxford in 1919 to read history, Brittain found it difficult as "a war survivor" to adjust to life in postwar society. She met Winifred Holtby at Somerville, and a close friendship developed. They both aspired to become established on the London literary scene, and shared various London flats after coming down from Oxford. Eventually Holtby would become part of the Brittain-Catlin household after Brittain's marriage. The bond lasted until Holtby's death from renal failure due to glomerulonephritis in 1935. Other literary contemporaries at Somerville included Dorothy L. Sayers, Hilda Reid, Margaret Kennedy and Sylvia Thompson.

In 1925, Brittain married George Catlin, a political scientist (1896–1979). Their son, John Brittain-Catlin (1927–1987), whose relationship with his mother steadily deteriorated as he got older, was an artist, painter, businessman and the author of the posthumously published autobiography Family Quartet, which appeared in 1987. Their daughter, born 1930, was the former Labour Cabinet Minister, later Liberal Democrat peer, Shirley Williams (1930–2021), one of the "Gang of Four" rebels on the Social Democratic wing of the Labour Party who founded the SDP in 1981. Like Brittain, George Catlin was raised Anglican, as his father was an Anglican clergyman, but unlike her, Catlin had converted to the Catholic Church.

Brittain's first published novel, The Dark Tide (1923), created scandal as it caricatured dons at Oxford, especially at Somerville. In 1933, she published the work for which she became famous, Testament of Youth, followed in 1940 by Testament of Friendship— her tribute to and biography of Winifred Holtby —and Testament of Experience (1957), the continuation of her own story, which spanned the years between 1925 and 1950. Brittain based many of her novels on actual experiences and actual people. In this regard, her novel Honourable Estate (1936) was autobiographical, dealing with her failed friendship with the novelist Phyllis Bentley, her romantic feelings for her American publisher George Brett Jr, and her brother Edward's death in action on the Italian Front in 1918. Brittain's diaries from 1913 to 1917 were published in 1981 as Chronicle of Youth. Some critics have argued that Testament of Youth often differs markedly from Brittain's writings during the war, especially in respect of her attitudes towards the war, which were more conventional in 1914–18.

In the 1920s, Brittain was a widely published journalist, in Time and Tide and many other newspapers and journals. At this time, she also became a regular speaker on behalf of the League of Nations Union, supporting the idea of collective security. However, in June 1936, in the wake of the bestsellerdom of Testament of Youth on both sides of the Atlantic, she was invited to speak at a vast peace rally at Maumbury Rings in Dorchester, where she shared a platform with various pacifists, including sponsors of the Peace Pledge Union, the largest pacifist organisation in Britain: Dick Sheppard, George Lansbury, Laurence Housman and Donald Soper. Afterwards, Sheppard invited her to join the Peace Pledge Union as sponsor. Following six months' careful reflection, she replied in January 1937 to say she would. Later that year, Brittain also joined the Anglican Pacifist Fellowship. Her newly found pacifism, increasingly Christian in inspiration, came to the fore during the Second World War, when she began the series of Letters to Peacelovers.

Throughout the 1930s, she moved between liberal Christian and secular humanist circles, and in 1935 gave a toast to the Rationalist Press Association celebrating the "gradual weakening of the power of superstition".

So we have not got a rational nation or a rational universe just yet; but the fact, does remain that the Rationalist Movement, the Rationalist Press Association, is one of our few remaining defences in the reactionary present against those conventions that cripple our lives and those blind and passionate follies that threaten to destroy them. If only we can keep this salutary flame burning during this period of our darkness, I believe that one day it will eventually blaze up until it lights the obscure corners of people’s minds, so that they no longer “see as through a glass darkly,” but with the clear light of reason and human intelligence. I think that one of the most hopeful signs at the present day, and one for which this Movement can take very great credit, is the gradual weakening of the power of superstition owing to the popularization of science, and to the way in which people are taking much more interest in scientific books

— Vera Brittain's toast the Rationalist Association

She was a practical pacifist in the sense that she helped the war effort by working as a fire warden and by travelling around the country raising funds for the Peace Pledge Union's food relief campaign. She was vilified for speaking out against saturation bombing of German cities through her 1944 booklet, published as Seed of Chaos in Britain and as Massacre by Bombing in the United States. In 1945, the Nazis' Black Book of nearly 3,000 people to be immediately arrested in Britain after a German invasion was shown to include her name.

From the 1930s onwards, Brittain was a regular contributor to the pacifist magazine Peace News. She eventually became a member of the magazine's editorial board and during the 1950s and 1960s was "writing articles against apartheid and colonialism and in favour of nuclear disarmament".

In November 1966, she suffered a fall in a badly-lit London street en route to a speaking engagement at St Martin-in-the-Fields. She attended the engagement, but afterwards found she had fractured her left arm and broken the little finger of her right hand. These injuries began a physical decline in which her mind became more confused and withdrawn. Around this time, the BBC interviewed her; when asked of her memories of Roland Leighton, she replied: "Who is Roland"?

Brittain never fully got over the death in June 1918 of her beloved brother, Edward. She died in Wimbledon on 29 March 1970, aged 76. Her will requested that her ashes be scattered on Edward's grave on the Asiago Plateau in Italy – "...for nearly 50 years much of my heart has been in that Italian village cemetery"— and her daughter honoured this request in September 1970. Some of Brittain's ashes were buried in 1979 in the grave of her husband Sir George Catlin in the churchyard of St James the Great, at Old Milverton in Warwickshire.

Vera Brittain's archive was sold in 1971 to McMaster University in Hamilton, Ontario, Canada. A further collection of papers, amassed during the writing of the authorised biography of Brittain, was donated to Somerville College Library, Oxford, by Paul Berry and Mark Bostridge.

== Posthumous tributes and evocations ==
Brittain was portrayed by Cheryl Campbell in the 1979 BBC2 television adaptation of Testament of Youth.

Songwriter and fellow Anglican Pacifist Fellowship member Sue Gilmurray wrote a song in Brittain's memory, titled Vera.

In 1996, The Great War and the Shaping of the 20th Century documentary series aired on the U.S. television network PBS. It chronicles World War I over eight episodes. Brittain's writings and experiences are covered in Episode 3, "Total War".

In 1998, Brittain's First World War letters were edited by Alan Bishop and Mark Bostridge and published under the title Letters from a Lost Generation. They were also adapted by Bostridge for a BBC Radio 4 series starring Amanda Root and Rupert Graves.

Because You Died, a new selection of Brittain's First World War poetry and prose, edited by Mark Bostridge, was published by Virago in 2008 to commemorate the 90th anniversary of the Armistice.

On 9 November 2008, BBC One broadcast an hour-length television documentary on Brittain as part of its Remembrance Day programmes hosted by Jo Brand, entitled A Woman in Love and War: Vera Brittain, where she was portrayed by Katherine Manners.

In February 2009, it was reported that BBC Films was to adapt Brittain's memoir Testament of Youth into a feature film. Irish actress Saoirse Ronan was cast to play Brittain at first. However, in December 2013, it was announced that Swedish actress Alicia Vikander would be playing Brittain in the film, which was released at the end of 2014 as part of the First World War commemorations. The film also starred Kit Harington, Colin Morgan, Taron Egerton, Alexandra Roach, Dominic West, Emily Watson, Joanna Scanlan, Hayley Atwell, Jonathan Bailey and Anna Chancellor. David Heyman (producer of the Harry Potter films) and Rosie Alison were the producers.

On 9 November 2018, a Wall Street Journal opinion commentary by Aaron Schnoor honoured the poetry of the First World War, including Brittain's poem Perhaps.

On 7 July 2023, the Buxton Festival staged the first of a run of performances of The Land of Might-Have-Been, a musical show drawing on existing songs by Ivor Novello, presenting a fictionalised version of Brittain's life in 1914 and 1915, and exploring her relationships with Roland, Edward, her brother's (fictional) gay lover Bobbie Jones, and the impact the war had on them.

Plaques marking Brittain's former homes can be seen at 9, Sidmouth Avenue, Newcastle-under-Lyme; 151 Park Road, Buxton; Doughty Street, Bloomsbury; and 117, Wymering Mansions, Maida Vale, west London. There is also a plaque in the Buxton Pavilion Gardens, commemorating Brittain's residence in the town, though the dates shown on the plaque for her time there are incorrect.

Brittain is the inspiration for Maud Gaunt, a secondary character in the novel In Memoriam (2023) by Alice Winn.

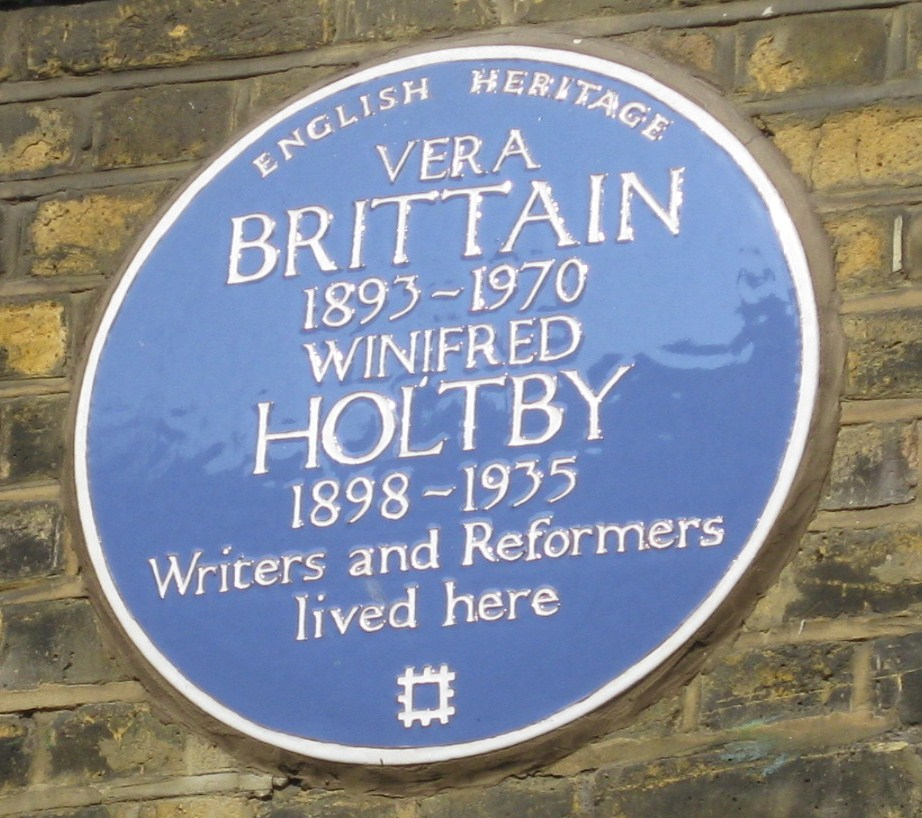
Plaque at 58 Doughty Street, London

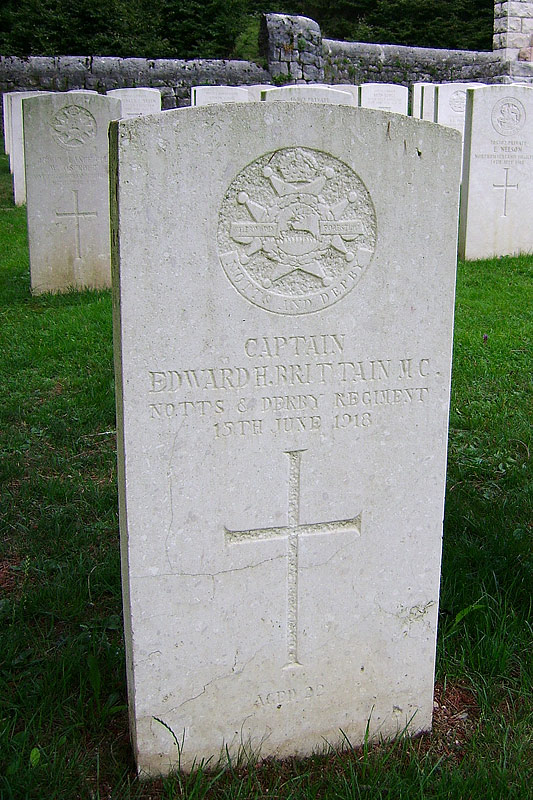
Tombstone of Edward Brittain, Granezza British Cemetery, Asiago Plateau

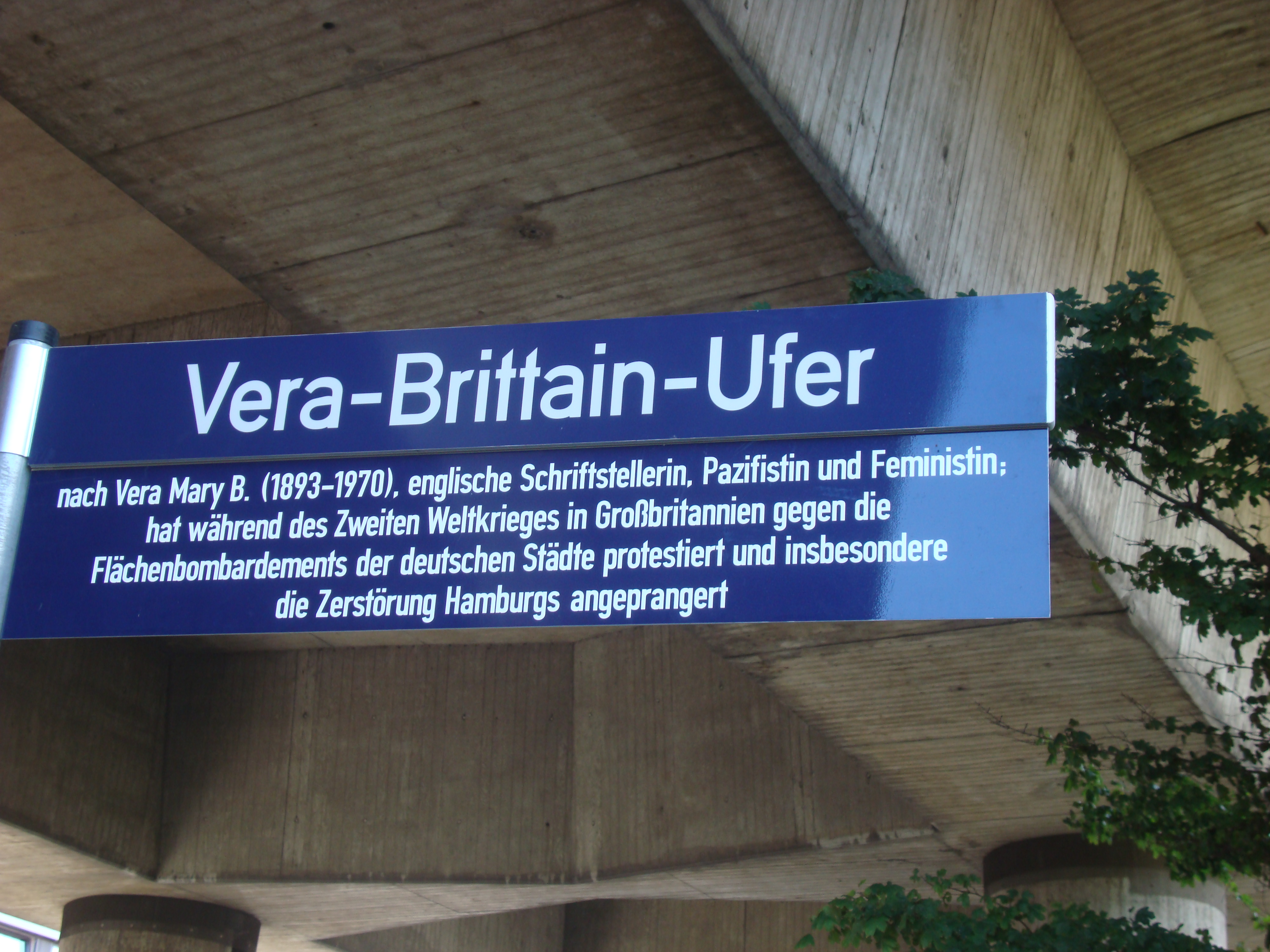
A promenade bears the name of Vera Brittain in Hamburg-Hammerbrook

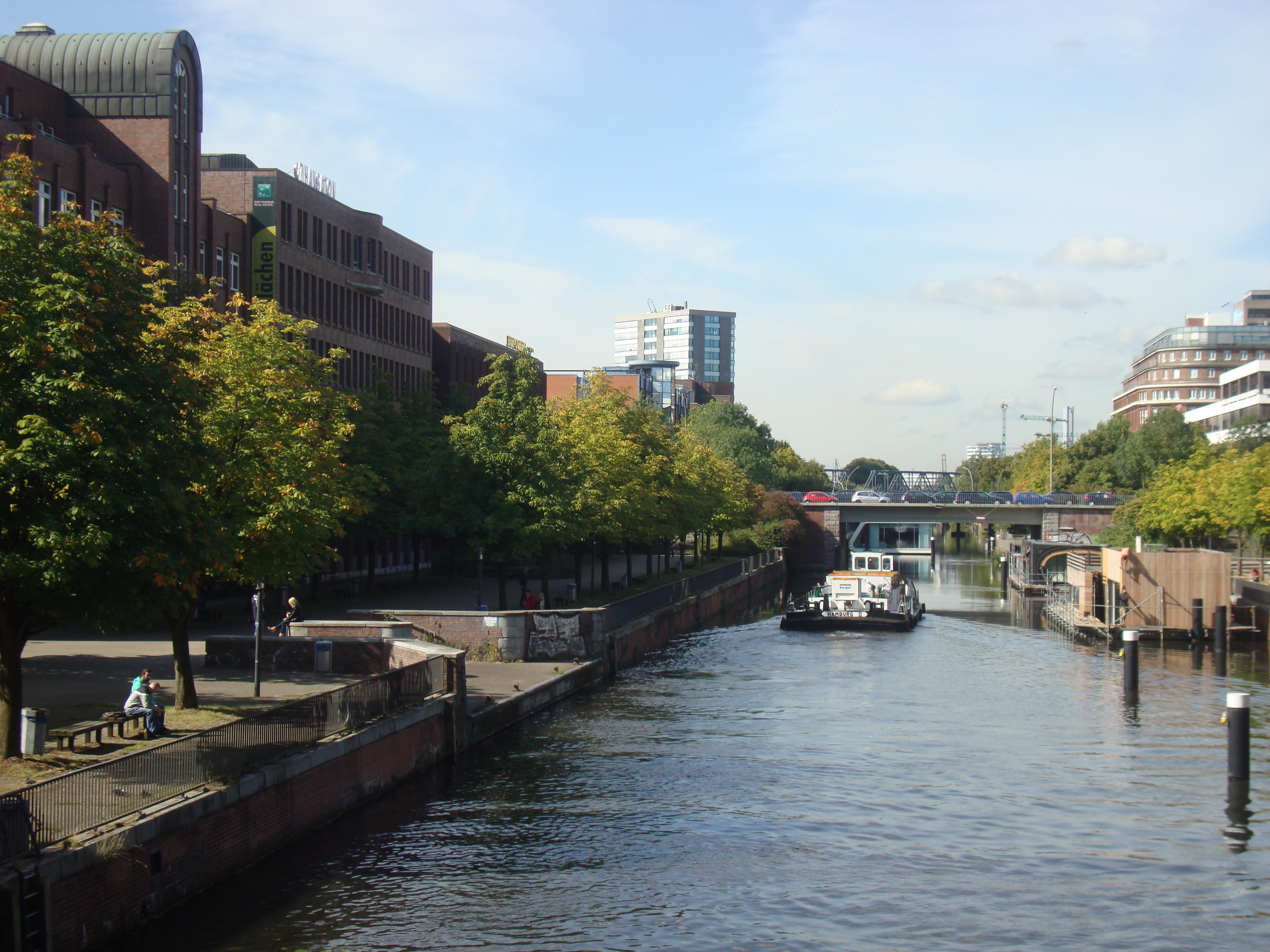
Vera Brittain Promenade, Hamburg

== Selected works ==
- 1923 – The Dark Tide
- 1929 – Halcyon: Or, The Future of Monogamy (To-day and To-morrow pamphlet series)
- 1933 – Testament of Youth
- 1936 – Honourable Estate
- 1938 – Thrice a Stranger. New Chapters of Autobiography
- 1940 – Testament of Friendship, the Story of Winifred Holtby
- 1940 – England's Hour
- 1942 – Humiliation With Honour
- 1944 – Seed of Chaos (Massacre by Bombing: U.S. title)
- 1947 – On Becoming a Writer
- 1948 – Born 1925, A Novel of Youth
- 1950 – In the Steps of John Bunyan. An Excursion into Puritan England
- 1951 – Search After Sunrise
- 1953 – Lady into Woman. A History of Women from Victoria to Elizabeth II
- 1957 – Testament of Experience. An Autobiographical Story of the Years 1925-1950/ Sequel to: Testament of Youth
- 1960 – The Women at Oxford : A Fragment of History
- 1963 – Pethick-Lawrence, A Portrait
- 1968 – Radclyffe Hall. A Case of Obscenity?
- 1981 – Chronicle of Youth: War Diary 1913-1917, edited by Alan Bishop with Terry Smart
- 1985 – Testament of a Generation. The Journalism of Vera Brittain and Winifred Holtby, edited by Paul Berry and Alan Bishop
- 1986 – Chronicle of Friendship: Diary of the Thirties, 1932-1939/ Sequel to: Chronicle of Youth
- 1989 – Wartime Chronicle: Diary 1939-1945/ Sequel to: Chronicle of Friendship
- 1998 – Letters from a Lost Generation, edited by Alan Bishop and Mark Bostridge
- 2008 – Because You Died. Poetry and Prose of the First World War and After, edited and introduced by Mark Bostridge

== Biographies ==
- Hilary Bailey, Vera Brittain, Harmondsworth, Middlesex, England: Penguin Books, 1987. ISBN 0140080031
- Jean E. Kennard, Vera Brittain & Winifred Holtby. A working partnership, Hanover, NH: University Press of New England, for University of New Hampshire, 1989 ISBN 0-87451-474-6
- Paul Berry and Mark Bostridge, Vera Brittain: A Life, Chatto & Windus, 1995, Pimlico, 1996, Virago, 2001, 2008 ISBN 1-86049-872-8.
- Deborah Gorham, Vera Brittain: A Feminist Life, University of Toronto Press, 2000. ISBN 0-8020-8339-0.
- Mark Bostridge, Vera Brittain and the First World War, Bloomsbury, 2014. ISBN 9781408188446 OCLC 902612485

== See also ==
- List of peace activists
