= Mark Bostridge =

British writer and critic

Mark Bostridge (born 1961) is a British writer and critic, known for his historical biographies.

== Life and career ==
He was educated at Westminster School and read Modern History at St Anne's College, Oxford, from 1979 to 1982. At Oxford, he was awarded the Gladstone Memorial Prize. After university, he worked for a time for the British politician Shirley Williams, then President of the SDP. Later, he worked for BBC Television.

His first book was Vera Brittain: A Life, co-written with Paul Berry and published in 1995. This biography of the writer and peace campaigner Vera Brittain was shortlisted for the two major non-fiction prizes of its day, the Whitbread Prize and the NCR Book Award as well as the Fawcett Prize. In a 2022 edition of the book, published by Virago, a new introduction by Bostridge explained how he came to be one of Brittain's biographers while still in his twenties, after Paul Berry, a close friend of Brittain's and one of her literary executors, found it impossible to write the book.

Bostridge enjoyed a good relationship with Brittain's daughter Shirley Williams, though they had differences over Bostridge's exposure of the tragic story of the death of Williams's uncle Edward Brittain, killed on the Italian Front in 1918, who Bostridge revealed to have been on the verge of being court-martialled for homosexual relationships with men in his company. To a large extent the biography was based on the massive archive of Brittain's papers preserved at McMaster University, at Hamilton in Ontario. Together with Paul Berry, Bostridge later established an archive of Brittain's papers at Somerville College, Oxford. This included much of the original material used in the writing of the biography. Following Berry's death in 1999, Bostridge continued to add to what became known as the Paul Berry Collection. The death of Shirley Williams in 2021 brought to the Somerville collection valuable original photographs relating to Vera Brittain's First World War experience.

Bostridge's further Brittain project was a collaboration with Alan Bishop, an academic at McMaster University, where Brittain's main archive is held, who was also the editor of three volumes of Vera Brittain's diaries. Their edition of her letters was published in 1998 as Letters from a Lost Generation to commemorate the eightieth anniversary of the Armistice. Bostridge adapted the letters for a BBC Radio Four fifteen-part series starring Amanda Root as Brittain and Rupert Graves as Roland Leighton, who was killed in the First World War. The book became a bestseller

Bostridge's Lives For Sale, an anthology of biographers' tales, was published in 2004 and was a BBC Radio 4 Book of the Week.

In 2008, he published Florence Nightingale: The Woman and Her Legend, the first major biography of Florence Nightingale in over half a century, based on the enormous number of archives of Nightingale material around the world, and on the little used archive of Verney family papers at Claydon House. The book was awarded the 2009 Elizabeth Longford Prize for Historical Biography and named as a Wall Street Journal Best Book of 2008 and an Atlantic Magazine top book of the year. 'It will not be superseded for generations', wrote the reviewer in the Daily Telegraph 'There will be other lives of Florence Nightingale', wrote the reviewer in The Observer, 'but it is hard to imagine one that brings her hard, driven brilliance back to life with such intelligence, imagination and sympathy. The book was featured as a BBC Radio 4 Book of the Week.

In 2008, Bostridge also published Because You Died, a selection of Vera Brittain's First World War poetry and prose, to mark the ninetieth anniversary of the Armistice.

In May 2009, Screen Daily reported that, as Brittain's biographer and by now one of her literary executors, he was working closely with BBC Films on a screen adaptation of Brittain's Testament of Youth. In December 2014, Bostridge's study Vera Brittain and the First World War, containing new research about Testament of Youth's evolution, and an account of the dramatisations of the book culminating in the new film version starring Alicia Vikander as Vera Brittain and Kit Harington as Roland Leighton, was published by Bloomsbury.

In January 2014, Penguin UK published Bostridge's The Fateful Year, a portrait of England in 1914: "a year that started in peace and ended in war". The book was shortlisted for the PEN Hessell-Tiltman Prize for History in 2015.

In June 2016, Bostridge was one of a group of biographers, historians, and other academics who signed a letter to The Times protesting at the erection of a statue to Mary Seacole at St Thomas' Hospital in London. In interviews Bostridge explained that he was not opposed to a statue to Seacole, but to the siting of it at the hospital where Florence Nightingale founded her nurse training school in 1860, influencing the development of nursing throughout the world. Bostridge argues that Seacole was not a "pioneer nurse" as some of the statue campaigners maintain. He also points to the way in which Nightingale's enormous contributions to public health are now commonly and mistakenly attributed to Seacole by a wide range of British institutions that, he says, should "frankly know better".

In an article published in the Times Literary Supplement in January 2020, Bostridge, who had introduced a new edition of the diaries of Francis Kilvert revealed that he had recently donated his diary to the Bodleian Library in Oxford. The diary will be embargoed for a number of years.

In 2024 Bloomsbury published his In Pursuit of Love. The Search for Victor Hugo's Daughter, an innovative biography-cum-memoir of Hugo's younger daughter Adèle Hugo. The Sunday Times described the book as 'Gloriously rich and capacious', while the reviewer in the Daily Telegraph stated that 'Bostridge...produces something of haunting beauty and stylistic grace'.

He is a brother of the tenor Ian Bostridge. They are the great-grandsons of the Millwall goalkeeper, John "Tiny" Joyce.
