= Cheryl Campbell =

English actress (born 1949)

- Born: 22 May 1949 (age 77); St Albans, Hertfordshire, England
- Education: London Academy of Music and Dramatic Art
- Occupation: Actress
- Years active: 1974–present

Cheryl Campbell (born 22 May 1949) is an English actress. She starred opposite Bob Hoskins in the 1978 BBC drama Pennies From Heaven, before going on to win the 1980 BAFTA TV Award for Best Actress for Testament of Youth and Malice Aforethought, and the 1982 Olivier Award for Best Actress in a Revival for A Doll's House. Her film appearances include Chariots of Fire (1981), Greystoke: The Legend of Tarzan, Lord of the Apes (1984) and The Shooting Party (1985).

== Early life ==
Born 22 May 1949 in St Albans, Hertfordshire. Campbell is the daughter of an airline pilot. She was educated at Francis Bacon Grammar School, St Albans, and at London Academy of Music and Dramatic Art (LAMDA). Her repertory theatre experience includes the Palace Theatre, Watford, Birmingham Rep and the Citizens' Theatre, Glasgow.

== Career ==
=== Film and TV ===
Campbell earned her first BAFTA nomination in 1978 for her portrayal of Eileen Everson, opposite Bob Hoskins in Dennis Potter's television serial Pennies from Heaven (1978).

Campbell is known for her starring role as Vera Brittain in the BBC's television dramatisation of Testament of Youth (1979), for which she received Best Actress awards from the British Academy Television Award (BAFTA) and the Broadcasting Press Guild Award.

Campbell's one other role in a work by Potter was as Janet in Rain on the Roof (1980). The same year, she starred as Sheila McVicar alongside Roger Daltrey in the prison escape film McVicar (1980), and played Jennie Liddell in Chariots of Fire (1981). She played Lady Alice Clayton, alongside Ian Holm and Christopher Lambert in Greystoke: The Legend of Tarzan, Lord of the Apes (1984).

In 2010 Campbell played Lucetta in the film Tamara Drewe (2010).

=== Stage ===
As a stage performer Campbell has twice been a member of the Royal Shakespeare Company. At the RSC in 1982, she appeared as Diana in All's Well That Ends Well, she played Nora Helmer in Adrian Noble's production of Ibsen's A Doll's House, for which she was awarded the Laurence Olivier Award for Best Actress in a Revival.

She returned to the RSC in the 1992–94 season, playing Lady Macbeth in Noble's production of Macbeth; Beatrice-Joanna in The Changeling; Mistress Ford in The Merry Wives of Windsor and Natasha in Misha's Party. She worked at the Royal National Theatre: playing as a junior member of the company in 1975, as Freda in Sir Peter Hall's Old Vic production of John Gabriel Borkman (starring Sir Ralph Richardson, Dame Peggy Ashcroft and Dame Wendy Hiller) and as Maggie in W. S. Gilbert's Engaged; in 1995, as Lady Politic Would-Be in Matthew Warchus's Volpone; and in 2003 as Dotty Otley in the NT's touring (and London) revival of Noises Off.

Campbell's other stage performances in London include You Never Can Tell (Lyric, 1979); Miss Julie (1983) in the title role; Little Eyolf (1985) as Asta; The Daughter-in-Law (1985) as Minnie; The Sneeze (a Chekhov selection) (1988) in various roles; Betrayal (1991) as Emma; The Strip (1995) as Loretta; Some Sunny Day (1996) as Emily; The Seagull (1997) as Arkadina; Passion (2000) as Nell; and Life After George (2002) as Beatrix.

== Filmography ==
=== Film ===
Year	Title	Role	Notes
1980	McVicar	Sheila McVicar	
1980	Hawk the Slayer	Sister Monica	
1981	Chariots of Fire	Jennie Liddell	
1984	Greystoke: The Legend of Tarzan, Lord of the Apes	Lady Alice Clayton	
1985	The Shooting Party	Aline, Lady Hartlip	
2010	Tamara Drewe	Lucetta	

=== Television ===
Year	Title	Role	Notes
1971-1977	Z-Cars	Terri/Helen Milne	2 episodes
1974	Affairs of the Heart	Emma Gosselin	
1975	Edward the Seventh	Princess Beatrice	2 episodes
1975	Within These Walls	Susan Carpenter	Episode: "Long Shadows"
1976	Killers	Miss Duncan	Episode: "The Crumbles Murder"
1978	Crown Court	Stella Martin-James	Serial: "The Green House Girls"
1978	Pennies From Heaven	Eileen	Miniseries
1978	The Sweeney	Erica Taylor	Episode: "Feet of Clay"
1978	Lillie	Sarah Bernhardt	Episode: "Let Them Say"
1979	Malice Aforethought	Madeleine Cranmere	Miniseries
1979	Testament of Youth	Vera Brittain	Miniseries
1980	Rain on the Roof	Janet	TV movie
1981	The Seven Dials Mystery	Lady Eileen 'Bundle' Brent	TV movie
1984	A Winter Harvest	Caroline Ashurst	3 episodes
1985	Absurd Person Singular	Eva Jackson	TV movie
1986	Agatha Christie’s Miss Marple	Griselda Clement	Episode: "The Murder at the Vicarage"
1987	A Sort of Innocence	Elizabeth Fellowes	6 episodes
1990	Centrepoint	Maria Wearing	4 episodes
1990	Boon	Pamela Drake	Episode: "The Tender Trap"
1990	Inspector Morse	Sylvie Maxton	Episode: "The Infernal Serpent"
1990	The Casebook of Sherlock Holmes	Lady Frances Carfax	Episode: "The Disappearance of Lady Frances Carfax"
1991	The Ruth Rendell Mysteries	Corrine Last	Episode: "Means of Evil"
1992	The Secret Agent	Winnie Verloc	Miniseries
1992	Maigret	Aline Bauche	Episode: "The Paitence of Maigret"
1995	Ghosts	Mrs. Maradick	Episode: "Shadowy Third
1996	Bramwell	Emily Coxon	1 episode
1997	The Mill on the Floss	Bessy Tulliver	TV movie
1999	Wing and a Prayer	Louise McAllister	1 episode
1999	A Touch of Frost	Diana Grey	Episode: "Appendix Man"
2000	Monsignor Renard	Madeleine Claveau	Miniseries
2000, 2013	Midsomer Murders	Sandra MacKillop/Vivian Stannington	2 episodes
2001	The Way We Live Now	Lady Carbury	Minseries
2002	Foyle's War	Emily Gascoigne	Episode: "A Lesson in Murder"
2003	William and Mary	Molly Gilcrest	
2005	To the Ends of the Earth	Lady Somerset	Episode: "Close Quarters"
2005	Waking the Dead	Maureen Hunt	Episode: "Undertow"
2005	Funland	Valerie Hinchcliffe	6 episodes
2006	Kenneth Williams: Fantabulosa!	Louie Williams	TV movie
2006	Dalziel and Pascoe	Jean Swainbank	Episode: "Fallen Angel"
2006	Spooks	Deputy Prime Minister	Episode: "Aftermath"
2007	Peep Show	Penny Chapman	2 episodes
2008	Lewis	Valli Helm	Episode: "Music to Die For"
2008	Agatha Christie's Poirot	Lady Boynton	Episode: "Appointment with Death"
2010	The Sarah Jane Adventures	Ocean Waters	Serial: "The Vault of Secrets"
2011	Casualty	Miriam Turner	10 episodes
2012, 2014	Call the Midwife	Lady Browne	3 episodes
2013	Breathless	Mrs Truscott	5 episodes
2015	Doctor Foster	Helen Foster	TV series, 3 episodes
