= Kit Harington =

English actor (born 1986)

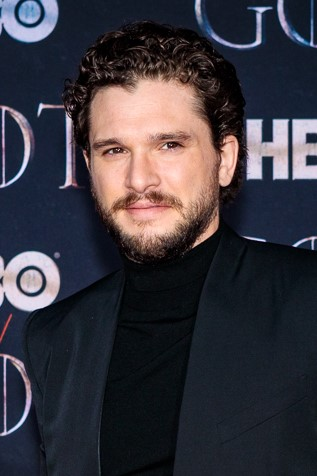
- Harington in 2019
- Born: Christopher Catesby Harington; 26 December 1986 (age 39); London, England
- Education: Royal Central School of Speech and Drama
- Occupation: Actor
- Years active: 2008–present
- Spouse: Rose Leslie (m. 2018)
- Children: 2
- Relatives: John Harington (ancestor); Robert Catesby (ancestor)

Christopher Catesby "Kit" Harington (born 26 December 1986) is an English actor. He is best known for his role as Jon Snow in the HBO fantasy television series Game of Thrones (2011–2019), for which he received a Golden Globe nomination and two nominations for Primetime Emmy Awards and Critics' Choice Television Awards.

A graduate of the Royal Central School of Speech & Drama, Harington made his professional acting debut in 2009 with the lead role of Albert Narracott in the West End play War Horse. He has since returned to the West End taking roles in productions of The Children's Monologues (2015), The Vote (2015), Doctor Faustus (2016), and True West (2018–2019). He portrayed the titular role in the revival of William Shakespeare's Henry V (2022). He starred in the London transfer of the Jeremy O. Harris play Slave Play (2024).

He developed, produced, and starred as Robert Catesby in the 2017 BBC drama series Gunpowder. He has also acted in the Amazon Prime Video romantic comedy anthology series Modern Love (2021), the Apple TV+ anthology series Extrapolations (2023), and the HBO/BBC One drama series Industry (2024–present), for which he has received critical acclaim. He has acted in films such as the historical action drama Pompeii (2014), the period drama Testament of Youth (2014), and the drama The Death & Life of John F. Donovan (2018). He portrayed Dane Whitman in the Marvel Cinematic Universe film Eternals (2021), and voiced Eret in the How to Train Your Dragon animated film series (2014–2019).

== Early life and family ==
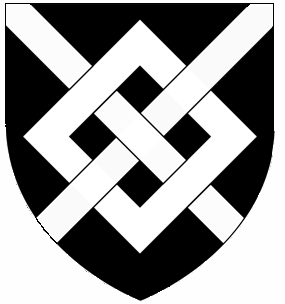
Arms of the Harington baronets

Christopher Catesby Harington was born on 26 December 1986 in Acton, West London. His mother named him after Christopher Marlowe, whose first name was shortened to Kit, a name Harington prefers. He did not learn what his full name was until age eleven. His parents are Sir David Harington, 15th Bt, a businessman and baronet, and former playwright Deborah Jane Catesby. He has one older brother.

Harington was educated at Southfield Primary School from 1992 to 1998. When he was eleven, the family moved to Worcestershire and he attended Chantry High School in Martley until 2003. He became interested in acting after seeing a production of Waiting for Godot when he was fourteen, and he performed in several school productions. He attended Worcester Sixth Form College, where he studied Drama and Theatre (2003–05). When he was seventeen, he was inspired to attend a drama school after seeing a performance by Ben Whishaw as Hamlet in 2004. Harington moved back to London in 2005 at the age of 18 after completing Sixth Form and, later that year, enrolled at the Central School of Speech and Drama, where he graduated in 2008.

== Career ==
=== 2008–2010: Early work in theatre ===
Before acting, Harington originally wanted to become a journalist. While still at drama school, he landed the role of Albert in the National Theatre's adaptation of War Horse. The play won two Olivier Awards and gained Harington a great deal of recognition. He was later cast in his second play Posh, a dark ensemble comedy about upper-class men attending Oxford University.

=== 2011–2019: Breakthrough with Game of Thrones ===
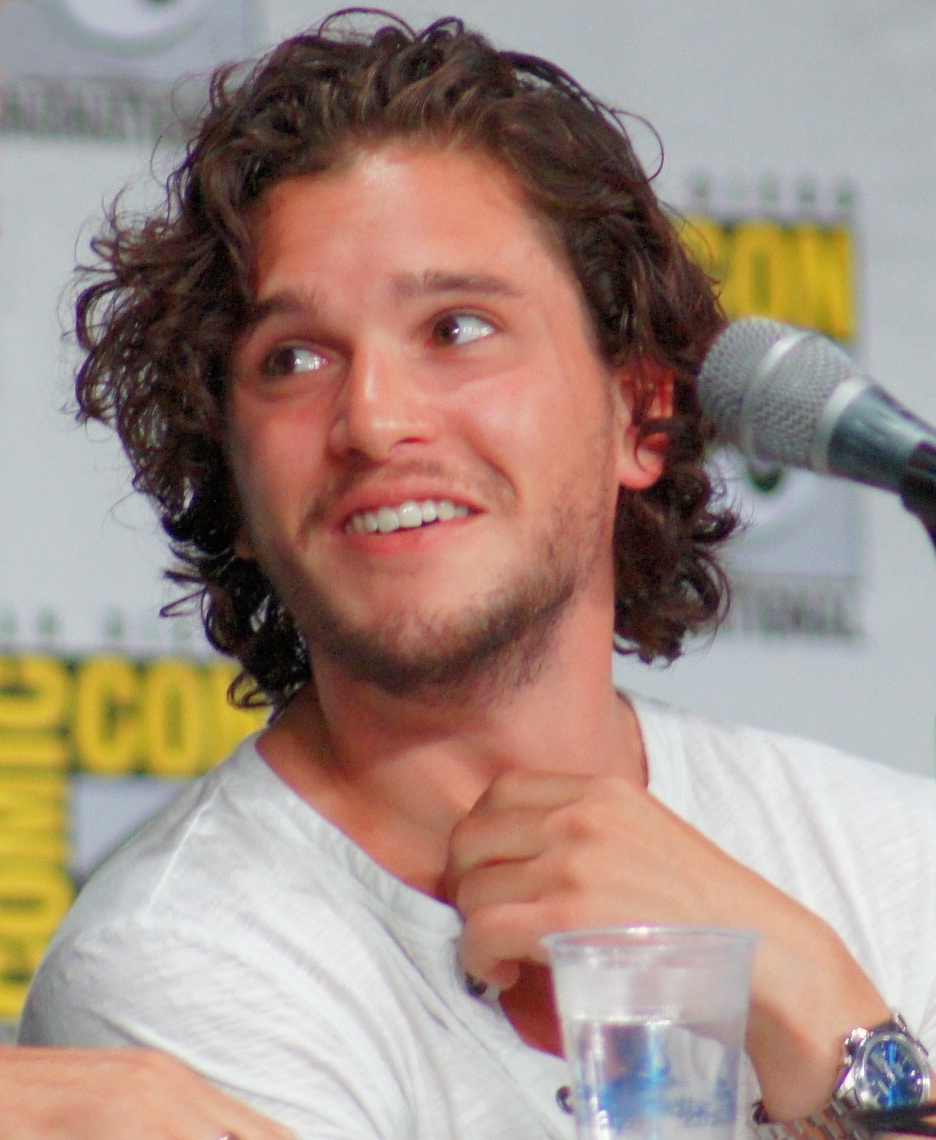
Harington at the 2011 San Diego Comic-Con

After War Horse, Harington auditioned for and landed his first television role as Jon Snow in the series Game of Thrones. The show debuted in 2011 to great critical acclaim and was quickly picked up by the network for a second season. Harington's role was largely filmed in Iceland and Northern Ireland. Harington received critical praise for his portrayal of Snow. In 2012, he was nominated for a Saturn Award for Best Supporting Actor on Television for the role. In 2016, Harington was nominated for a Primetime Emmy Award for Outstanding Supporting Actor in a Drama Series, as well as a Primetime Emmy Award for Outstanding Lead Actor in a Drama Series in 2019. In 2017, Harington had reportedly become one of the highest-paid actors on television, earning £2 million per episode of Game of Thrones. The series concluded its run with its eighth season in April 2019.

Harington made his feature film debut in 2012 as Vincent in Silent Hill: Revelation. The horror film was based on the survival horror video game Silent Hill 3, and was a sequel to the film Silent Hill. He was honoured with Actor of the Year at the Young Hollywood Awards 2013, which celebrates the best emerging young talent in film, music and television. Harington's first major lead role in a feature film occurred when he starred in Paul W. S. Anderson's Pompeii (2014). Production for the film commenced in 2013 and took place in and around Toronto, Ontario, Canada. Some scenes were also shot in the actual city of Pompeii itself. Harington chose to undergo intensive body transformation under the guidance of a personal trainer, who grew concerned of the actor's growing body dysmorphia. The film received generally mixed to negative responses from critics and met with modest box office success. That year, Harington also voiced Eret in the DreamWorks Animation film How to Train Your Dragon 2, which was a critically acclaimed box office success, won the Golden Globe Award for Best Animated Feature Film and received an Academy Award nomination. He later reprised the role in the 2019 film How to Train Your Dragon: The Hidden World, which also was a critical and commercial success and also received Golden Globe and Academy Award nominations.

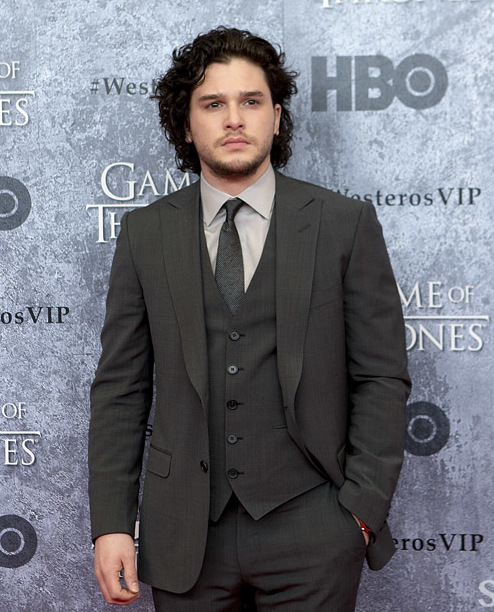
Harington at the season three premiere of Game of Thrones in 2013

In 2014, Harington also appeared alongside Jeff Bridges in the film Seventh Son, a poorly received fantasy–adventure film. Harington played Billy Bradley, Bridges' first apprentice killed early in the film by a character played by Julianne Moore. Ben Barnes, Alicia Vikander and Emily Watson also star. The film was released in wide distribution in the UK on 16 January 2015. Its world premiere was in The Centrepiece Gala, supported by the Mayor of London, at the British Film Institute London Film Festival in October 2014. In December 2014, it was announced that he would star in Xavier Dolan's upcoming film The Death and Life of John F. Donovan. On 1 August 2018, it was announced that the film would have its world premiere at the 2018 Toronto International Film Festival. The film received poor reviews.

He starred in the 2015 HBO comedy 7 Days in Hell, a short film about a seven-day tennis match. In June 2015, it was confirmed that Harington would star in Martin Koolhoven's upcoming western thriller film Brimstone, replacing Robert Pattinson. In 2016, Harington starred as Salen Kotch, the main villain in the first-person shooter video game Call of Duty: Infinite Warfare. That same year he starred in a West End production of Doctor Faustus. The production, as well as his performance, received unfavourable critical reviews.

In February 2017, it was reported that Harington would write, star in and executive produce Gunpowder, a three-part historical drama for BBC based on the real story of the Gunpowder Plot. He played the role of his ancestor Robert Catesby alongside actors Mark Gatiss, Liv Tyler and Peter Mullan. In June 2018, it was announced that Harington would star in the West End upcoming stage play True West, written by Sam Shepard and directed by Matthew Dunster. The play premiered in November 2018 at the Vaudeville Theatre in London and closed in February 2019. That same year he hosted the NBC sketch show Saturday Night Live with musical guest Sara Bareilles. His Game of Thrones cast mates Rose Leslie and Emilia Clarke made appearances during the opening monologue.

=== 2020–present: career expansion ===
In 2020, Harington took part in a virtual performance of an extract from the play Burn by playwright Chris Thompson. In September 2020, it was announced that he would appear in the second season of the Netflix anthology series Criminal: UK. The series premiered on 16 September to positive reviews. In August 2019, Harington joined the Marvel Cinematic Universe in an undisclosed role. The role was later revealed to be Dane Whitman in Chloé Zhao's Eternals acting opposite Richard Madden, Gemma Chan, Kumail Nanjiani, Brian Tyree Henry, and Angelina Jolie. The film was released in November 2021 and received mixed reviews from critics, while grossing over $402 million worldwide. That same year he was cast in the second season of the Amazon Prime Video anthology series Modern Love acting opposite Lucy Boynton in the satirical romantic comedy episode "Strangers on a (Dublin) Train".

In March 2022, Harrington played the titular role in Donmar Warehouse's run of Henry V. In May, it was announced that Harington would star in Mary’s Monster, a film about author Mary Shelley's mental struggle to write her 1818 novel Frankenstein. That same month, he also joined Scoot McNairy and Josh Lucas in the action thriller Blood for Dust. In June 2022, A Song of Ice and Fire author George R. R. Martin revealed that a Jon Snow spin-off series was in early development, and that it was Harington who first brought the idea for the project. Harington later revealed that the show was no longer in development, stating that the team "couldn't find the right story to tell" and that the project was "off the table for the foreseeable future."

In March 2023, Harington featured in the Apple TV+ series Extrapolations as Nicholas Bilton. Harington is producing a TV thriller, Empire of Dirt described as "a very British Western" about a maven who discovers his family is running a drugs racket. In 2024 he was cast in the West End transfer of the Jeremy O. Harris play Slave Play at the Noël Coward Theatre in 2024. That same year he was cast in a main role in the third season of the HBO/BBC One series Industry where he played Henry Muck, an aristocrat and CEO of a green energy company. He reprised the role for the fourth season, which premiered in 2026. Harington has received critical acclaim for his role on Industry, with Hannah J. Davies of The Guardian calling it a "career-best" performance.

In September 2025, Harington was cast as Sydney Carton in the upcoming BBC One miniseries A Tale of Two Cities, adapted from the novel of the same name by Charles Dickens. Harington is also an executive producer on the miniseries. In March 2026, Harrington announced during his interview on The Tonight Show Starring Jimmy Fallon that he would star in the Hulu limited series Count My Lies alongside Lindsay Lohan and Shailene Woodley.

== Personal life ==
In 2017, Harington purchased a £1.75 million 15th-century country home outside Ipswich, Suffolk.

Harington began a relationship with his Game of Thrones co-star Rose Leslie in 2011. They announced their engagement through the 'Forthcoming Marriages' section of The Times on 27 September 2017.

On 23 June 2018, the couple married at Rayne Parish Church in Aberdeenshire, Scotland. In September 2020, Leslie posed for a magazine photo shoot visibly pregnant. They had a son, by February 2021. In February 2023, Harington announced he and Leslie were expecting their second child. In July 2023, the couple confirmed the birth of their daughter.

In May 2019, Harington checked into a mental health and wellness facility to seek help for "some personal issues". In 2024, Harington publicly spoke about his struggles with anxiety and alcoholism, and revealed that he had been diagnosed with ADHD while in rehab.

Harington is a football fan and a supporter of Manchester United. Harington is on the cultural advisory board of Colossal Biosciences.

== Charity work ==
In 2015, Harington joined a cast including Benedict Cumberbatch, Nicole Kidman, James McAvoy and Christopher Eccleston in a charity production of The Children's Monologues, conceived by Oscar-winning director Danny Boyle. The performance took place at the Royal Court Theatre in London, on 25 October. Proceeds went to Boyle's creative arts charity Dramatic Need, which helps vulnerable children in South Africa and Rwanda to build hope and self-belief in the face of conflict, trauma and hardship.

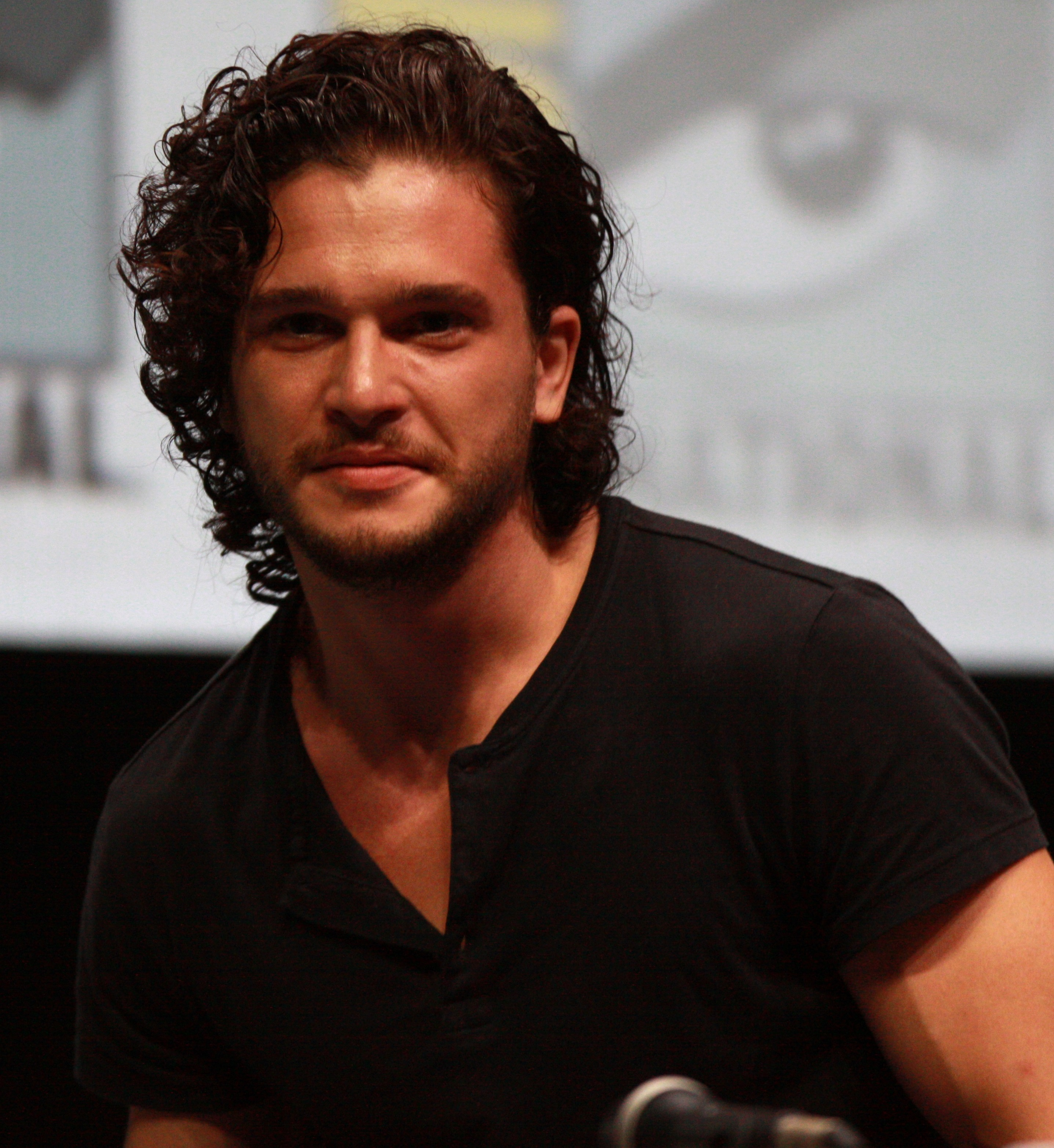
Harington at Comic Con in 2014

Since April 2016, Harington has been an ambassador for The Royal Mencap Society; a leading organisation in the United Kingdom helping people with learning difficulties that also provides support for their families and caregivers. On 16 April 2016, he was appointed as a patron of Longlands Care Farm, a charity located on a working livestock farm in Worcestershire, in which they care for, mentor and support disadvantaged and vulnerable young people aged 14 – 19 who are not succeeding in mainstream education. On 12 September 2016, Harington, as well as Cate Blanchett, Chiwetel Ejiofor, Peter Capaldi, Douglas Booth, Neil Gaiman, Keira Knightley, Juliet Stevenson, Jesse Eisenberg, and Stanley Tucci, featured in a video from the United Nations' refugee agency UNHCR to help raise awareness of the global refugee crisis. The video, titled "What They Took With Them", has the actors reading a poem, written by Jenifer Toksvig and inspired by primary accounts of refugees, and is part of UNHCR's WithRefugees campaign, which also includes a petition to governments to expand asylum to provide further shelter, integrating job opportunities, and education.

In August 2017, with a video backing Mencap StopSleepInCrisis, Harington called on the government to fund six years' back pay for overnight carers. In a personal message of support, Harington said: "The learning disability sector in the UK is on the brink of crisis. It is faced with a back-pay bill of £400 million which it cannot pay. Many of the providers of this essential, 'sleep-in' service, face bankruptcy. And some of the most vulnerable people in our society will be left, without care, without hope and without an independent future. Stand with Mencap and stand with the incredible people our colleagues support and care for every day."

In 2018, he joined Tom Hiddleston, Kristin Scott Thomas, Jeremy Irons and Indira Varma among others for a one-off charity gala celebrating the life and work of Harold Pinter, directed by Jamie Lloyd. The event Happy Birthday, Harold took place at the Harold Pinter Theatre in London, on 10 October and comprised a varied programme of Pinter's work. Proceeds went to Amnesty International and Chance to Shine – two of Pinter's favoured charities.

In 2022, during the Russian invasion of Ukraine, Harington supported a humanitarian campaign by starring in a video where he asked to help Ukrainian refugees. Harington auctioned off signed Game of Thrones memorabilia to support Ukraine.

== Acting credits ==
Key
†	Denotes films that have not yet been released

=== Film ===
List of Kit Harrington film credits
Year	Title	Role	Notes	Ref.
2012	Silent Hill: Revelation	Vincent Smith		
2014	Pompeii	Milo		
2014	How to Train Your Dragon 2	Eret	Voice role	
2014	Testament of Youth	Roland Leighton		
2014	Seventh Son	Billy Bradley		
2015	Spooks: The Greater Good	Will Holloway		
2016	Brimstone	Samuel		
2018	The Death & Life of John F. Donovan	John F. Donovan		
2019	How to Train Your Dragon: The Hidden World	Eret	Voice role	
2021	Eternals	Dane Whitman		
2022	Baby Ruby	Spencer		
2023	Blood for Dust	Ricky		
2024	The Beast Within	Noah		
2025	Eternal Return	Virgil		
2025	The Family Plan 2	Finn Clarke		
2026	The Dreadful	Jago		

=== Television ===
List of Kit Harrington television credits
Year	Title	Role	Notes	Ref.
2011–2019	Game of Thrones	Jon Snow	Main role, 63 episodes	
2015	7 Days in Hell	Charles Lloyd Poole	Television film	
2017	Gunpowder	Robert Catesby	Miniseries; also creator and executive producer	
2018	Zog	Sir Gadabout (voice)	Television film	
2019	Saturday Night Live	Himself (host)	Episode: "Kit Harington/Sara Bareilles"	
2020	Criminal: UK	Alex	Episode: "Alex"	
2020	Zog and the Flying Doctors	Sir Gadabout (voice)	Television film Archive footage showing Gadabout's first encounter with Zog, featuring his legs only, lines overdubbed by Daniel Ings	
2021	Friends: The Reunion	Himself	Television special	
2021	Modern Love	Michael	Episode: "Strangers on a (Dublin) Train"	
2023	Extrapolations	Nicholas Bilton	4 episodes	
2023	Lot No. 249	Abercrombie Smith	One-off Christmas special	
2024–	Industry	Henry Muck	Main role; series 3–4	
2025	Too Much	Jessica's Father	3 episodes	
2026	A Tale of Two Cities †	Sydney Carton	Main role; also executive producer	
2027	Count My Lies †	Jay Lockhart	Main role	
TBA	Harry Potter †	Professor Gilderoy Lockhart	Supporting role; season 2	
TBA	Army of Shadows †		Upcoming series	

Key
†	Denotes television productions that have not yet been released

=== Theatre ===
Kit Harrington stage credits
Year	Title	Role	Notes	Ref.
2008–09	War Horse	Albert Narracott	Royal National Theatre and Gillian Lynne Theatre	
2010	Posh	Ed Montgomery	Royal Court Theatre	
2015	The Children's Monologues	Reader	Royal Court Theatre	
2015	The Vote	Colin Henderson	Donmar Warehouse	
2016	Doctor Faustus	Faustus	Duke of York's Theatre	
2018–19	True West	Austin	Vaudeville Theatre	
2022	Henry V	Henry V	Donmar Warehouse	
2024	Slave Play	Jim	Noël Coward Theatre	

=== Radio ===
List of Kit Harrignton radio credits
Year	Title	Voice role	Notes	Ref.
2019	Chivalry	Sir Galaad	BBC Radio 4	

=== Video games ===
List of Kit Harrington video game credits
Year	Title	Voice role	Notes	Ref.
2015	Game of Thrones	Jon Snow	Based on the TV series	
2016	Call of Duty: Infinite Warfare	Salen Kotch	Also motion capture and likeness	
2024	Game of Thrones: Legends	Jon Snow	Archival audio and likeness; also appeared in trailer	

=== Audiobook ===
Year(s)	Title	Role	Notes
2025	Harry Potter and the Chamber of Secrets	Professor Gilderoy Lockhart	Audible Exclusive
2026	Harry Potter and the Order of the Phoenix	Professor Gilderoy Lockhart	Audible Exclusive
2026	The Murder at the vicarage	Reverend Leonard Clement	Audible Exclusive

== Awards and nominations ==
Year	Award	Category	Work	Result	Ref.
2011	Scream Awards	Best Ensemble (shared with the cast)	Game of Thrones	Nominated	
2011	Screen Actors Guild Awards	Outstanding Performance by an Ensemble in a Drama Series (shared with the cast)	Game of Thrones	Nominated	
2011	IGN Award	Best TV Hero	Game of Thrones	Nominated	
2011	IGN People's Choice Award	Best TV Hero	Game of Thrones	Nominated	
2011	Saturn Awards	Best Supporting Actor on Television	Game of Thrones	Nominated	
2012	Golden Nymph Award	Outstanding Actor in a Drama Series	Game of Thrones	Nominated	
2013	Young Hollywood Awards	Actor of the Year	–	Won	
2013	Screen Actors Guild Awards	Outstanding Performance by an Ensemble in a Drama Series (shared with the cast)	Game of Thrones	Nominated	
2014	Screen Actors Guild Awards	Outstanding Performance by an Ensemble in a Drama Series (shared with the cast)	Game of Thrones	Nominated	
2015	Empire Award	Empire Hero Award (shared with the cast)	Game of Thrones	Won	
2015	Saturn Awards	Best Supporting Actor on Television	Game of Thrones	Nominated	
2015	Screen Actors Guild Awards	Outstanding Performance by an Ensemble in a Drama Series (shared with the cast)	Game of Thrones	Nominated	
2016	Primetime Emmy Awards	Outstanding Supporting Actor in a Drama Series	Game of Thrones	Nominated	
2016	Critics' Choice Awards	Best Supporting Actor in a Drama Series	Game of Thrones	Nominated	
2016	Screen Actors Guild Awards	Outstanding Performance by an Ensemble in a Drama Series (shared with the cast)	Game of Thrones	Nominated	
2016	Saturn Awards	Best Supporting Actor on Television	Game of Thrones	Nominated	
2017	Giffoni Film Festival	Giffoni Experience Award	–	Won	
2017	Screen Actors Guild Awards	Outstanding Performance by an Ensemble in a Drama Series (shared with the cast)	Game of Thrones	Nominated	
2018	Saturn Awards	Best Supporting Actor on Television	Game of Thrones	Nominated	
2019	Golden Globe Awards	Best Actor – Television Series Drama	Game of Thrones	Nominated	
2019	Primetime Emmy Awards	Outstanding Lead Actor in a Drama Series	Game of Thrones	Nominated	
2019	Screen Actors Guild Awards	Outstanding Performance by an Ensemble in a Drama Series (shared with the cast)	Game of Thrones	Nominated	
2019	Critics' Choice Awards	Best Actor in a Drama Series	Game of Thrones	Nominated	
2019	People's Choice Awards	The Male TV Star of 2019	Game of Thrones	Nominated	
2019	Saturn Awards	Best Actor on Television	Game of Thrones	Nominated	
