= List of University of Oxford people =

This page serves as a central navigational point for lists of more than 2,350 members of the University of Oxford, divided into relevant groupings for ease of use. The vast majority were students at the university, although they did not necessarily take a degree; others have held fellowships at one of the university's colleges; many fall into both categories. This page does not include people whose only connection with the university consists of the award of an honorary degree or an honorary fellowship.

The list has been divided into categories indicating the field of activity in which people have become well known. Many of the university's alumnae, or old members, as they are more traditionally known, have attained a level of distinction in more than one field. These appear only in the category with which it is felt they are most often associated, or in which they have been more recently involved. Hence Jeffrey Archer (Brasenose), a novelist, is listed as a life peer; Imran Khan (Keble), a former captain of the Pakistani cricket team, is listed as a Pakistani politician. Some academic disciplines are more difficult to define than others. In particular, many theologians, lawyers, and sociologists work in areas that might be thought to be encompassed by philosophy.

Oxonians (a term for members, students or alumni of the university derived from its Latin name, Academia Oxoniensis) have included two British kings and at least fifteen monarchs of eleven other sovereign states (including five reigning monarchs), twenty-eight British prime ministers, and thirty-five presidents and prime ministers of nineteen other countries. As of July 2019 there are seven Oxonians in the Cabinet of the United Kingdom and two in the Shadow Cabinet. The university lays claim to thirteen saints, ten blesseds, an antipope, nineteen cardinals, and eighty-nine archbishops (including thirty-two of Canterbury and twenty-two of York). The university claims forty-seven Nobel laureates and three Fields Medallists. The university's oldest student was Gertrud Seidmann, who was awarded a Certificate of Graduate Attainment aged 91.

This list also includes twenty-five princes and princesses (among them the heirs apparent of Belgium and Brunei), thirty-four dukes, nineteen marquesses, eighty-two earls and countesses, forty-six viscounts and viscountesses, and 188 barons and baronesses; 246 bishops (Anglican and Catholic); 291 members of Parliament (excluding MPs who were subsequently peers), eleven members of the European Parliament (excluding MEPs also serving at Westminster), twelve lord chancellors, nine lord chief justices and twenty-two law lords; ten US senators, ten US representatives (including a speaker of the House), three state governors, and four associate justices of the US Supreme Court; and six puisne justices of the Supreme Court of Canada and a chief justice of the now defunct Federal Court of Canada.

== Religions ==
=== Christianity ===
Saints

Blessed

Pope

Cardinals

Archbishops of Canterbury

Archbishops of York

Other archbishops, presiding bishops, and metropolitans

Other Bishops

Clergy and other ministers

Theologians

== Literature ==
=== Poets ===
Poets Laureate

- Samuel Daniel (Magdalen Hall) Poet Laureate 1599–1619
- William Davenant (Lincoln) Poet Laureate 1637–1668
- Thomas Warton (Trinity) Poet Laureate 1785–90
- Henry James Pye (Magdalen Hall) Poet Laureate 1790–1813
- Robert Southey (Balliol) Poet Laureate 1813–43
- Robert Bridges (Corpus Christi) Poet Laureate 1913–30
- Cecil Day-Lewis (Wadham) Poet Laureate 1967–72
- John Betjeman (Magdalen) Poet Laureate 1972–84
- Andrew Motion (University) Poet Laureate 1999–2009
- William Morris (Exeter) declined laureateship 1896
- Philip Larkin (St John's and All Souls) declined laureateship 1984

==== Other poets ====
- John Abbot (Balliol)
- Janet Adam Smith (Somerville)
- Drummond Allison (The Queen's)
- Edwin Arnold (University)
- Matthew Arnold (Balliol)
- W. H. Auden (Christ Church and Exeter)
- Owen Barfield (Wadham)
- Reem Bassiouney (Somerville)
- Katharine Lee Bates
- Thomas Lovell Beddoes (Pembroke)
- Audrey Beecham (Somerville)
- Henry Charles Beeching (Balliol)
- Hilaire Belloc (Balliol)
- Laurence Binyon (Trinity)
- John Francis Bloxam (Exeter)
- Edmund Blunden (The Queen's)
- Edwin Emmanuel Bradford (Exeter)
- Thomas Edward Brown (Christ Church and Oriel)
- Alan Brownjohn (Merton)
- Charles Stuart Calverley (Balliol)
- Vahni Capildeo (Christ Church)
- Thomas Carew (Merton)
- Sydney Carter (Balliol)
- Upile Chisala
- Arthur Hugh Clough (Balliol)
- Robert P. T. Coffin
- Wendy Cope (St Hilda's)
- Samuel Elsworth Cottam (Exeter)
- Kevin Crossley-Holland (St Edmund Hall)
- John Davies (The Queen's)
- Vinícius de Moraes (Marcus Vinicius da Cruz de Mello Moraes)
- John Donne (Hertford) Member of Parliament 1601 and 1614, dean of St Paul's 1621–31
- Lord Alfred Douglas (Magdalen)
- Ernest Dowson (The Queen's)
- Edward Dyer (Balliol or Broadgates Hall)
- T. S. Eliot (Merton)
- U. A. Fanthorpe (St Anne's)
- John Fuller (New College and Magdalen)
- Viola Garvin (Somerville)
- Sydney Goodsir Smith (Oriel)
- Richard Graves (Pembroke)
- Robert Graves (St John's)
- Julian Grenfell (Balliol)
- Jane Griffiths
- Stephen Hawes
- Robert Stephen Hawker (Pembroke)
- Seamus Heaney (Magdalen)
- John Heath-Stubbs (The Queen's)
- Geoffrey Hill (Keble)
- Gerard Manley Hopkins (Balliol)
- A. E. Housman (St John's)
- Elizabeth Jennings (St Anne's)
- Jenny Joseph (St Hilda's)
- Sidney Keyes
- Nicole Krauss
- Walter Savage Landor (Trinity)
- Eugene Lee-Hamilton (Oriel)
- Richard Lovelace (Gloucester Hall)
- George MacBeth (New College)
- Louis MacNeice (Merton)
- Glyn Maxwell (Worcester)
- Elma Mitchell (Somerville)
- Dom Moraes (Jesus)
- Arthur Nortje
- Tom Paulin (Hertford and Lincoln)
- F. T. Prince (Balliol)
- Craig Raine (Exeter and New College)
- John Crowe Ransom (Christ Church)
- Nesca Robb (Somerville)
- Alan Ross (St John's)
- F. R. Scott
- E. J. Scovell (Somerville)
- Patrick Shaw-Stewart (Balliol)
- Percy Bysshe Shelley (University)
- Philip Sidney (Christ Church)
- Charles Sorley (University)
- Bernard Spencer (Corpus Christi)
- Stephen Spender (University)
- Pauline Stainer (St Anne's)
- Jon Stallworthy (Magdalen and Wolfson)
- Eric Stenbock (Balliol)
- Algernon Charles Swinburne (Balliol)
- Michael Symmons Roberts (Regent's Park)
- John Addington Symonds (Balliol and Magdalen)
- Kim Taplin (Somerville)
- Edward Thomas (Lincoln)
- Michael Thwaites
- Thomas Traherne (Brasenose)
- Julian Turner (New College)
- Henry Vaughan (Jesus)
- Helen Waddell (Somerville)
- John Wain (St John's)
- Robert Penn Warren (New College)
- Samuel Wesley (Exeter)
- Henry Willobie (St John's and/or Exeter)
- John Wilmot, 2nd Earl of Rochester (Wadham)
- Fabian Strachan Woodley (University)
- David Wright (Oriel)
- Kit Wright
- Thomas Yalden (Magdalen)
- Natan Yonatan
- Edward Young (New College, Corpus Christi, and All Souls)

=== Novelists and story writers ===
- Diran Adebayo
- Naomi Alderman (Lincoln)
- Monica Ali (Wadham)
- Kingsley Amis (St John's)
- Martin Amis (Exeter)
- Louise Bagshawe (Christ Church)
- Katharine Lee Bates
- Daniel Blythe (St John's)
- Marjorie Boulton (Somerville)
- William Boyd (Jesus)
- Vera Brittain (Somerville)
- Christine Brooke-Rose (Somerville)
- John Buchan, 1st Baron Tweedsmuir (Balliol) MP 1927–35, governor general of Canada 1935–1940
- A. S. Byatt (Somerville)
- Mike Carey
- Hugo Charteris
- Amit Chaudhuri (Balliol)
- Susanna Clarke (St Hilda's)
- Edmund Crispin (Bruce Montgomery) (St John's) also a noteworthy composer
- Guy Davenport (Merton)
- Robertson Davies (Balliol)
- Lindsey Davis (Lady Margaret Hall)
- Helen DeWitt (Lady Margaret Hall and Brasenose)
- Siobhan Dowd (Lady Margaret Hall)
- John Meade Falkner (Hertford)
- Gertrude Minnie Faulding (Somerville)
- Helen Fielding (St Anne's)
- Penelope Fitzgerald (Somerville)
- Richard Flanagan
- Margaret Forster (Somerville)
- Celia Fremlin (Somerville)
- John Galsworthy (New College)
- Maggie Gee (Somerville)
- Amitav Ghosh (Balliol)
- Victoria Glendinning (Somerville)
- William Golding (Brasenose)
- Graham Greene (Balliol)
- Mark Haddon (Merton)
- Catherine Heath (St Hilda's)
- Joseph Heller (St Catherine's)
- Zoë Heller (St Anne's)
- Robert Henriques (New College)
- Peter Hobbs (New College)
- Jane Aiken Hodge (Somerville)
- Alan Hollinghurst (Magdalen)
- Winifred Holtby (Somerville)
- Thomas Hughes (Oriel)
- Aldous Huxley (Balliol)
- Muriel Jaeger (Somerville)
- Joanna Kavenna (Linacre and St Antony's)
- Rachel Kelly
- Hari Kunzru (Wadham)
- Perceval Landon (Hertford)
- Marghanita Laski (Somerville)
- John le Carré (Lincoln)
- Harper Lee
- Margaret Leigh (Somerville)
- Peter Levi (Campion Hall)
- Matthew Gregory Lewis (Christ Church)
- Toby Litt (Worcester)
- Rose Macaulay (Somerville)
- Grace McCleen
- Val McDermid (St Hilda's)
- Charlotte Mendelson
- Naomi Mitchison (St Anne's)
- Iris Murdoch (Somerville and St Anne's)
- Gregory Norminton (Regent's Park)
- V. S. Naipaul (University)
- Kathleen Nott (Somerville)
- Christine Orr (Somerville)
- Iain Pears (Wadham)
- Philip Pullman (Exeter)
- Barbara Pym (St Hilda's)
- Hilda Stewart Reid (Somerville)
- Mary Renault (St Hugh's)
- Michèle Roberts (Somerville)
- Abu Rushd Matinuddin
- Edward St Aubyn (Keble)
- Dorothy L. Sayers (Somerville)
- Will Self (Exeter)
- Vikram Seth (Corpus Christi)
- Neil Spring (Somerville)
- Hilary Spurling (Somerville)
- Michael Innes (Oriel and Christ Church)
- Anna Stothard (Lincoln)
- Plum Sykes (Worcester)
- Sylvia Thompson (Somerville)
- Rachel Trickett (St Hugh's and Lady Margaret Hall)
- Joanna Trollope (St Hugh's)
- Philip Turner (Worcester)
- Lucy Wadham (Magdalen)
- Doreen Wallace (Somerville)
- Jill Paton Walsh (St Anne's)
- Rex Warner (Wadham)
- Auberon Waugh (Christ Church)
- Evelyn Waugh (Hertford)
- Angus Wilson (Merton)
- Laura Wilson (Somerville)
- Jeanette Winterson (St Catherine's)
- P. C. Wren (St Catherine's)
- Elizabeth Young, Baroness Kennet (Somerville)
- Tope Folarin (Harris Manchester)

=== Dramatists ===
- Achmed Abdullah (Alexandr Nicholaievich Romanov)
- Francis Beaumont (Broadgates Hall)
- Alan Bennett (Exeter)
- Thomas Chaundler
- Caryl Churchill (Lady Margaret Hall)
- Richard Curtis (Christ Church)
- Russell T Davies (Worcester)
- William Douglas-Home (New College)
- Samuel Foote (Worcester)
- John Ford (Exeter)
- Christopher Hampton (New College)
- Richard Hughes (Oriel)
- Marcy Kahan (Somerville)
- Girish Karnad (Lincoln and Magdalen)
- Margaret Kennedy (Somerville)
- Thomas Lodge (Trinity)
- Christine Longford, Countess of Longford (Somerville)
- Patrick Marber (Wadham)
- Christabel Marshall (Somerville)
- John Marston (Brasenose)
- Herman Charles Merivale (Balliol)
- Thomas Middleton (The Queen's)
- Peter Morris (Somerville)
- John Mortimer (Brasenose)
- Thomas Nabbes (Exeter)
- Thomas Otway (Christ Church)
- George Peele (Broadgates Hall and Christ Church)
- Dennis Potter (New College)
- Terence Rattigan (Trinity)
- James Roose-Evans
- Baņuta Rubess
- Charles Sedley (Wadham)
- R. C. Sherriff (New College)
- James Shirley (St John's)
- James Townley (St John's)
- Nicholas Udall (Corpus Christi)
- Oscar Wilde (Magdalen)
- Peter Wildeblood (Trinity)
- Emlyn Williams (Christ Church)
- William Wycherley (The Queen's)
- Elizabeth Young, Lady Kennet (Somerville)

=== Children's writers ===
- Richard Adams (Worcester) author of Watership Down
- Giles Andreae creator of Purple Ronnie and Edward Monkton
- W. V. Awdrey (St Peter's and Wycliffe Hall) creator of Thomas the Tank Engine
- T. A. Barron
- Nina Bawden (Somerville)
- Lesley M. M. Blume
- Lucy M. Boston (Somerville)
- Lewis Carroll (Christ Church)
- Pauline Clarke (Somerville)
- Olivia Coolidge (Somerville)
- Susan Cooper (Somerville)
- Cressida Cowell (Keble)
- Gillian Cross (Somerville)
- Thomas Day (Corpus Christi)
- Ruby Ferguson (St Hilda's)
- Theodor Seuss Geisel (Dr Seuss) (Lincoln)
- Frances Hardinge (Somerville)
- Roger Lancelyn Green (Merton) also a biographer and librarian
- Penelope Lively (St Anne's)
- Lady Flora McDonnell (Exeter)
- Michelle Paver (Lady Margaret Hall)
- Michael Rosen (Wadham)
- Constance Savery (Somerville)
- Ann Schlee (Somerville)
- Matthew Skelton (Somerville)
- Francesca Simon creator of Horrid Henry
- Frederic Weatherly (Brasenose) also King's Counsel, poet, sci-fi and fantasy writer
- Diana Wynne Jones (St Anne's)

=== Scholars, critics, diarists, publishers, librarians ===
- Joseph Addison (The Queen's and Magdalen)
- Jean Aitchison (Worcester)
- Peter Bayley (University)
- John Bayley (St Catherine's)
- Max Beerbohm (Merton)
- Stephen Bernard (Christ Church, Brasenose, and Univ)
- Homi K. Bhabha
- James H. Billington (Balliol)
- Andrew Cecil Bradley (Balliol)
- Melvyn Bragg (Wadham)
- Jacky Bratton (St Anne's)
- Katharine Mary Briggs (Lady Margaret Hall)
- Vera Brittain (Somerville)
- Cleanth Brooks (Exeter)
- Robert Burchfield (Magdalen and Christ Church)
- Sir Raymond Carr (Christ Church, New College, All Souls and St Antony's)
- Alasdair Clayre (All Souls)
- Peter Conrad (Christ Church and All Souls)
- Janet E. Courtney (Lady Margaret Hall)
- Jonathan Culler
- Christopher de Hamel
- Thomas de Quincey (Brasenose)
- Susie Dent
- Terry Eagleton (Wadham, Linacre, and St Catherine's)
- Richard Ellmann (New College)
- Paul Engle
- Geoffrey Faber (Christ Church)
- James Fenton (Magdalen)
- Henry Watson Fowler (Balliol)
- Adam Fox (Magdalen)
- Leela Gandhi
- William Gifford (Exeter)
- Victor Gollancz (New College)
- George Stuart Gordon (Oriel and Magdalen)
- John Haffenden (St John's and Magdalen)
- Ian Hamilton (Keble)
- Richard Hakluyt (Christ Church)
- Hugh Haughton
- George Birkbeck Norman Hill (Pembroke)
- Christopher Hitchens (Balliol)
- Thomas James (New College)
- Samuel Johnson (Pembroke)
- Antony Kamm (Worcester)
- Andrew Lang (Balliol)
- Gerard Langbaine (University)
- Monica Jones (St Hugh's)
- John Lahr (Worcester)
- Andrew George Lehmann
- C.S. Lewis (University and Magdalen)
- Alain LeRoy Locke (Hertford)
- Edward Lucie-Smith (Merton)
- Fiona MacCarthy
- Peter McDonald (University and Christ Church)
- Robert Macfarlane (Magdalen)
- Norris McWhirter (Trinity) co-founder, Guinness Book of Records (1955)
- Ross McWhirter (Trinity) co-founder, Guinness Book of Records (1955)
- Ved Mehta (Balliol)
- Kate Millett (St Hilda's) author of Sexual Politics (1970), founder of Women's Art Colony Farm (1971)
- Peter Milward (Campion Hall) emeritus professor of English Literature Sophia University
- Toril Moi (Lady Margaret Hall and Pembroke)
- Jan Morris (St Edmund Hall and Christ Church)
- Brian Morris, Baron Morris of Castle Morris (Worcester)
- Raymond Mortimer (Balliol)
- Douglas Murray (Magdalen)
- Beverley Nichols (Balliol)
- Harold Nicolson (Balliol)
- David Norbrook (Balliol, Magdalen, and Merton)
- Michael O'Neill (Exeter)
- Francis Turner Palgrave (Balliol and Exeter)
- Walter Pater (The Queen's)
- William Paton Ker (Balliol and All Souls)
- Reynolds Price (Merton)
- Arthur Quiller-Couch (Trinity)
- Walter Alexander Raleigh (Merton)
- Nick Rees-Roberts (Keble)
- C. Allen Thorndike Rice publisher of the North American Review
- Christopher Ricks (Balliol and Worcester)
- Neil Leon Rudenstine (New College) president of Harvard University 1991–2001
- John Campbell Shairp (Balliol)
- Susan Sontag (St Anne's)
- Richard Steele (Merton)
- Percy Stephensen (The Queen's)
- J. I. M. Stewart (Oriel and Christ Church)
- Jonathan Swift (Hertford)
- Ann Thwaite (St Hilda's)
- J. R. R. Tolkien (Exeter and Pembroke)
- Jenny Uglow (St Anne's)
- Guðbrandur Vigfússon
- Elizabeth Wade White
- Fredric Warburg (Christ Church)
- Marina Warner (Lady Margaret Hall)
- Joseph Warton (Oriel)
- Raymond Williams
- Simon Winchester (St Catherine's)
- George Woodcock
- Ghil'ad Zuckermann (St Hugh's)

=== Travel and non-fiction writers ===
- Katharine Lee Bates

== Media ==
Many journalists work in both print and broadcast media. The following are listed under the medium for which they are best known. Those who are known solely as sports commentators will be found at List of University of Oxford people in sport, exploration, and adventuring.

=== Print ===
==== Editors ====
- Paul Anderson (Balliol) Tribune 1991–93, deputy New Statesman 1993–96
- Perry Anderson (Worcester) New Left Review 1962–82 & 2000–03
- Lionel Barber (St. Edmund) The Financial Times 2005–
- Paul Barker (Brasenose) New Society 1968–86
- Peter Beinart (University) The New Republic 1999–2006, editor-at-large 2006–
- Tina Brown (St Anne's) Tatler 1979–83, Vanity Fair 1984–92, The New Yorker 1992–98
- George Earle Buckle (New College and All Souls) The Times 1884–1912
- Alastair Burnet (Worcester) The Economist 1965–74, The Daily Express 1974–76
- Charles C. W. Cooke (LMH) National Review Online 2016–
- William Percival Crozier (Trinity) The Manchester Guardian 1932–44
- Matthew d'Ancona (Magdalen and All Souls) The Spectator 2006–
- Geoffrey Dawson (Magdalen and All Souls) The Times 1912–19 & 1923–41
- John Thadeus Delane (Magdalen Hall) The Times 1841–77
- Bill Emmott (Magdalen) The Economist 1993–2006
- James Fallows (The Queen's) U.S. News & World Report 1996–98
- Kim Fletcher (Hertford) The Independent on Sunday 1998–99, Ed Dir Telegraph New Media 2000–03, ed dir Telegraph Group 2003–05
- Paul Foot (University) Socialist Worker 1972–78
- John Gross (Wadham) Times Literary Supplement 1974–81, New York Times Book Review (dep. editor) 1985–1989
- John Lawrence Hammond (St John's) The Speaker 1899–1906
- Max Hastings The Daily Telegraph 1986–95, The Evening Standard 1996–2001
- Alastair Hetherington (Corpus Christi) The Guardian 1956–75
- Ian Hislop (Magdalen) Private Eye 1986–
- Anthony Howard (Christ Church) New Statesman 1972–78, deputy The Observer 1981–88
- Brian Inglis (Magdalen) The Spectator 1959–62
- Richard Ingrams (University) co-founder Private Eye 1961, editor 1963–86, founder The Oldie 1992
- Aboubakr Jamaï (University) co-founder Le Journal Hebdomadaire 1997, co-founder Assahifa al-Ousbouiya 1998
- Simon Jenkins (St John's) Evening Standard 1976–78, The Times 1990–92
- Paul Johnson (Magdalen) New Statesman 1965–70
- Mehreen Khan Financial Times 2016–22, The Times 2022–
- Michael Kinsley (Magdalen) The New Republic 1979–81 & 1985–89, Slate 1996–2002, sometime of Harper's Magazine
- Andrew Knight (Balliol) The Economist 1974–86
- Richard Lambert (Balliol) Financial Times 1991–2001, director general Confederation of British Industry 2006–
- Dominic Lawson (Christ Church) The Spectator 1990–95, The Sunday Telegraph 1995–2005
- John Micklethwait (Magdalen) The Economist 2006–
- Ferdinand Mount (Christ Church) Times Literary Supplement 1991–2003
- Rowan Pelling (St Hugh's) Erotic Review 1997–
- Peter Preston (St John's) The Guardian 1975–95
- William Rees-Mogg (Balliol) The Times 1967–81, chairman Arts Council 1982–89
- C. P. Scott (Corpus Christi) The Manchester Guardian 1872–1929
- Edward Taylor Scott The Manchester Guardian 1929–32
- Paul Spike (St Catherine's) Punch 1997
- Richard Stengel (Christ Church) managing editor Time 2006–
- Peter Stothard (Trinity) The Times 1992–2002, Times Literary Supplement 2002–
- Andrew Sullivan (Magdalen) The New Republic 1991–96
- Hilary Wainwright Red Pepper
- John Walter (Trinity) The Times 1803–09
- Norman Webster (St John's) sometime editor-in-chief The Globe and Mail, Montreal Gazette
- Jacob Weisberg (New College) sometime of Slate
- Andreas Whittam Smith (Keble) The Independent 1986–93, president of the British Board of Film Classification 1997–2002, First Church Estates commissioner 2002–
- Peregrine Worsthorne (Magdalen) The Sunday Telegraph 1986–89

==== Writers ====
- David Aaronovitch (Balliol)
- Tariq Ali (Exeter)
- Yasmin Alibhai-Brown (Linacre)
- Lynn Barber
- Katharine Lee Bates
- Nora Beloff (Lady Margaret Hall)
- Catherine Bennett (Hertford)
- Stephen Bernard (Christ Church, Brasenose College, University College)
- Adrian Berry, 4th Viscount Camrose (Christ Church)
- Michael Billington (St Catherine's)
- Grace Blakeley (St Peter's and St Antony's)
- Anna Blundy
- Emma Brockes (St Edmund Hall)
- James Buchan (Magdalen)
- David Caute (Wadham, St Antony's, and All Souls) literary editor New Statesman 1979–80
- Hugh Chisholm (Christ Church) editor of Encyclopædia Britannica (11th & 12th edns)
- Alexander Cockburn (Keble)
- Andrew Cockburn (Worcester)
- Claud Cockburn
- Patrick Cockburn (Trinity)
- Peter Conradi (Brasenose)
- Robert Crampton
- George Dangerfield (Hertford) literary editor Vanity Fair 1933–35
- Nick Denton (University)
- E. J. Dionne
- Cordelia Fine
- Jonathan Freedland (Wadham)
- Thomas Friedman American journalist, author and a three-time winner of the Pulitzer Prize
- Barton Gellman
- Alan Gibson (Queen's)
- Maurizio Giuliano (University)
- Richard Gott
- Tom Gross (Wadham)
- John Harris (The Queen's)
- Julia Hartley-Brewer (Magdalen)
- Mehdi Hasan (Christ Church)
- Christopher Hitchens (Balliol)
- Anthony Holden
- Austen Ivereigh (St Antony's) director of Public Affairs, archbishop of Westminster 2004–06
- Rachel Johnson (New College)
- Owen Jones (University)
- Tobias Jones (Jesus)
- John F. Jungclaussen (St Cross College)
- Oliver Kamm (New College)
- John Keay (Magdalen)
- Robert Kee (Magdalen)
- Lucy Kellaway (Lady Margaret Hall)
- Ludovic Kennedy (Christ Church)
- Martin Kettle (Balliol)
- Miles Kington (Trinity)
- Charles Krauthammer
- Nicholas D. Kristof (Magdalen)
- Christina Lamb (University)
- Osbert Lancaster (Lincoln)
- Nathaniel Lande creative director of Time, director of Time World News Service & Time-Life
- Paul Levy (Nuffield)
- James McDonald (University)
- Derek Malcolm (Merton)
- Peter Millar (Magdalen)
- Seumas Milne (Balliol)
- Baisali Mohanty (Wolfson)
- Sheridan Morley (Merton)
- Harry Mount
- Eustace Clare Grenville Murray (Hertford) diplomat 1851–68, founder Queen's Messenger 1869, co-founder World 1874
- James Owen (University)
- Melanie Phillips (St Anne's)
- Adam Raphael (Oriel)
- Kate Rew
- W. Andrew Robinson (University) literary editor Times Higher Education Supplement
- Miranda Sawyer (Pembroke)
- William Shawcross (University)
- Sonia Sodha (St Hilda's)
- Charles Spencer, 9th Earl Spencer (Magdalen)
- Guy Spier (Brasenose)
- George Steer (Christ Church)
- Jonny Steinberg
- Heather Stewart (Magdalen)
- Frances Stonor Saunders (St Anne's)
- David Stubbs
- Matthew Sweet
- Polly Toynbee (St Anne's)
- Kenneth Tynan (Magdalen)
- Sharon Waxman (St Antony's)
- Michael Wharton (Lincoln)
- Geoffrey Wheatcroft (New College)
- Christine Whelan (Worcester) author of Why Smart Men Marry Smart Women
- George Will (Magdalen)
- Tom Wintringham (Balliol) founder Daily Worker (1930) and Left Review (1934)
- John Woodcock (Trinity)
- Adrian Wooldridge (Balliol and All Souls)
- Hugo Young (Balliol)
- Toby Young (Brasenose)

=== Broadcast ===
- Samira Ahmed (St Edmund Hall)
- Jackie Ashley (St Anne's)
- Zeinab Badawi (St Hilda's)
- Paul Barry
- Frank Bough (Merton)
- Gyles Brandreth (New College)
- Ben Brown (Keble)
- Fiona Bruce (Hertford)
- Michael Brunson (The Queen's)
- Brenda Buttner (Balliol)
- Reeta Chakrabarti (Exeter)
- Jo Coburn
- Charles Collingwood
- Alan Connor (Wadham)
- Giles Coren (Keble)
- Victoria Coren (St John's)
- Michael Crick (New College)
- Adam Curtis (Mansfield)
- Evan Davis (St John's)
- Peter Davis (Pembroke)
- Robin Day (St Edmund Hall)
- David Dimbleby (Christ Church)
- Stephanie Flanders (Balliol)
- Matt Frei (St Peter's)
- Delia Gallagher (Blackfriars)
- Paul Gambaccini (University)
- Arnab Goswami (St. Antony's College)
- Krishnan Guru-Murthy (Hertford)
- Lowri Gwilym
- Guto Harri (The Queen's)
- Russell Harty (Exeter)
- Chris Hollins (Keble)
- Gordon Honeycombe (University)
- Simon Jack
- Sarah Jarvis
- Sally Jones (St Hugh's)
- Natasha Kaplinsky (Hertford)
- Katty Kay
- Martha Kearney (St Anne's)
- Bridget Kendall (Lady Margaret Hall and St Antony's)
- Kenneth Kendall
- Victoria Lautman (Merton)
- Alvar Lidell (Exeter)
- Rachel Maddow (Lincoln)
- Magnus Magnusson (Jesus)
- Howard Marshall (Oriel)
- Rex Murphy
- Cathy Newman (Lady Margaret Hall)
- Rageh Omaar (Exeter)
- Robert Orchard
- Robert Peston (Balliol)
- Libby Purves (St Anne's)
- Esther Rantzen (Somerville)
- Katie Razzall (Pembroke)
- Nigel Rees (New College)
- Sophy Ridge (St Edmund Hall)
- Rachel Riley (Oriel)
- James Robbins (Christ Church)
- Nick Robinson (University)
- Robert Robinson (Exeter)
- Vir Sanghvi (Brasenose)
- Rajdeep Sardesai (University)
- Tim Sebastian
- John Sergeant (Magdalen)
- Peter Sissons (University)
- Howard K. Smith (Merton)
- Dan Snow (Balliol)
- Peter Snow (Balliol)
- Francine Stock (Jesus)
- Manisha Tank
- Karan Thapar (St. Antony's College)
- Louis Theroux (Magdalen)
- Alex Thomson (University)

=== Administration ===
- Jana Bennett head of Science BBC 1994–2002, director of Television 2002–06, director of Vision 2006–
- Seymour Berry, 2nd Viscount Camrose (Christ Church) MP 1941–45, dep chmn Telegraph 1939–87, vice chmn Amalgamated Press 1942–59
- Michael Berry, Baron Hartwell (disclaimed 3rd Viscount Camrose) (Christ Church) chairman and editor-in-chief The Daily Telegraph and The Sunday Telegraph until 1986
- John Birt, Baron Birt (St Catherine's) BBC director-general 1992–2000
- Michael Checkland (Wadham) BBC director-general 1987–1992
- Calvin Cheng (Hertford) founder Looque International (2004)
- Arthur fforde (Trinity) headmaster of Rugby 1948–57, chairman of the BBC 1957–64
- Maurice Gorham (Balliol) controller BBC Television Service 1946–47, director Radio Éireann 1953–59
- Hugh Greene (Merton) BBC director-general 1960–1969
- Tony Hall (Keble) BBC director-general 2013–2020
- George Howard, Baron Howard of Henderskelfe (Balliol) chairman of the BBC 1980–83
- Jeremy Isaacs (Merton) Channel 4 chief executive 1981–87
- Walter Isaacson (Pembroke) chairman & CEO of CNN 2001–3, president & CEO of Aspen Institute 2003–
- Roly Keating (Balliol) controller of BBC Four 2002–04, controller of BBC Two 2004–
- Alasdair Milne (New College) BBC director-general 1982–1987
- Rupert Murdoch (Worcester) founder, chairman, and CEO News Corporation 1980–
- Frederick Ogilvie (Jesus) BBC director-general 1938–1942
- Cathy Rogers creative director RDF Media (Los Angeles) 2001–
- Howard Stringer (Merton) chairman and CEO Sony Corporation 2005–
- Mark Thompson (Merton) BBC director-general 2004–2012

== The arts ==
=== Stage and television ===
- Maria Aitken (St Anne's)
- Kenneth Barnes (Christ Church)
- Eve Best (Lincoln)
- Niamh Blackshaw
- Bunny Breckinridge
- Richard Burton (Exeter)
- Gemma Chan (Worcester)
- Hugh Dancy (St. Peter's)
- Oliver Ford Davies (Merton)
- Michael Denison (Magdalen)
- George Devine
- Rosaline Elbay (Oriel)
- Alfred Enoch (The Queen's)
- Michael Flanders (Christ Church) Flanders and Swann
- Emilia Fox (St Catherine's)
- Rebecca Front (St Hugh's)
- Val Gielgud
- Emily Hamilton
- Robert Hardy (Magdalen)
- Charles Hawtrey (Pembroke)
- George Procter Hawtrey (Pembroke)
- Sophie Hunter
- Felicity Jones (Wadham)
- Harry Lloyd (Christ Church)
- Louis Marks (Balliol)
- Ian Marter
- Jodhi May (Wadham)
- Emily Mortimer (Lincoln)
- Katherine Parkinson (St Hilda's)
- Rosamund Pike (Wadham)
- Emma D’Arcy (St Edmund Hall)
- Hugh Quarshie (Christ Church)
- Diana Quick (Lady Margaret Hall)
- Wallace Shawn
- Waen Shepherd
- Donald Swann (Christ Church) Flanders and Swann
- Honeysuckle Weeks (Pembroke)
- Samuel West (Lady Margaret Hall)
- Simon Woods (Magdalen)
- Emily Woof
- Michael York (University)

=== Comedy ===
- Rowan Atkinson (The Queen's)
- Angus Deayton (New College)
- Sophie Duker (Wadham)
- Paul Foot (Merton)
- Deborah Frances-White (Harris Manchester)
- Ivo Graham (University)
- Richard Herring (St Catherine's)
- Armando Iannucci (University)
- Terry Jones (St Edmund Hall)
- Emma Kennedy (St Edmund Hall)
- Stewart Lee (St Edmund Hall)
- Josie Long (Lady Margaret Hall)
- Dudley Moore (Magdalen) (St Edmund Hall)
- Al Murray (St Edmund Hall)
- Michael Palin (Brasenose)
- Rachel Parris (St Hilda's)
- Sally Phillips (New College)
- Jon Plowman (University)
- John Robins (St Anne's)
- David Schneider (Exeter)
- Mel Smith (New College)
- Laura Solon (Worcester)
- Andy Zaltzman (University)

=== Film ===
- Lindsay Anderson
- Kate Beckinsale (New College)
- Frank Cottrell Boyce (Keble)
- Donald Crisp Academy Award for Best Supporting Actor 1941
- Pippa Cross
- Florian Henckel von Donnersmarck (New College) Academy Award for Best Foreign Language Film 2007
- Alice Eve (St. Catherine's)
- David Giles (Oriel)
- Hugh Grant (New College)
- Tom Hooper (University) Academy Award for Best Director 2010 for The King's Speech
- Ken Loach (St Peter's)
- Terrence Malick (Magdalen)
- Laura Mulvey
- Paweł Pawlikowski (Magdalen)
- Rosamund Pike (Wadham)
- Dilys Powell (Somerville)
- Tony Richardson Academy Award for Best Director 1963 for Tom Jones
- John Schlesinger (Balliol) Academy Award for Best Director 1969 for Midnight Cowboy
- David Shields (Wycliffe)
- Emma Watson (Lady Margaret Hall, Worcester)
- Michael Winterbottom (Balliol)

=== Dance ===
- Baisali Mohanty (Wolfson)

=== Music ===
Composers

- Richard Addinsell (Hertford)
- Thomas Ashwell (Cardinal College)
- Richard Baker (Exeter)
- Edward Bairstow (Balliol)
- Lennox Berkeley (Merton)
- George Butterworth (Trinity)
- Barney Childs (Oriel)
- Reginald de Koven (St John's)
- John Dowland (Christ Church)
- Paul Drayton (New College)
- John Farmer (Balliol)
- John Gardner (Exeter)
- Howard Goodall (Christ Church)
- William Henry Harris (New College and Christ Church)
- Basil Harwood (Trinity and Christ Church)
- Joseph Horovitz (New College)
- Michael John Hurd (Pembroke)
- Peter Lawlor (Brasenose)
- Kenneth Leighton (The Queen's and Worcester)
- Andrew Lloyd Webber (Magdalen)
- Thomas Morley (Christ Church)
- Herbert Murrill (Worcester) prof of Composition Royal Academy of Music 1933–52, hd of Music BBC 1950–52
- Tarik O'Regan (Pembroke & New College)
- Stephen Oliver (Worcester)
- Ian Parrott (New College)
- Charles Hubert Hastings Parry (Exeter)
- Rachel Portman (Worcester)
- Thomas Preston (Magdalen)
- Daniel Purcell (Magdalen)
- Bernard Rose (The Queen's and Magdalen)
- Erik Routley (Mansfield)
- Robert Saxton (Worcester)
- Tim Souster (New College)
- John Stainer (Magdalen)
- Robert Steadman (Keble)
- Robert Still (Trinity)
- John Taverner (Christ Church)
- William Walton (Christ Church)
- Peter Warlock (Christ Church)
- Thomas Weelkes (New College)
- James Whitbourn (Magdalen and St Stephen's)
- Philip Wilby (Keble)
- Sandy Wilson (Oriel)

Conductors

- Thomas Beecham (Wadham)
- Harry Bicket (Christ Church)
- Adrian Boult (Christ Church)
- Harry Christophers (Magdalen)
- Nicholas Cleobury (Worcester)
- Laurence Cummings (Christ Church)
- Jane Glover (St Hugh's)
- Vernon Handley (Balliol)
- John Landor London Musical Arts Orchestra
- David Lloyd-Jones (Magdalen)
- Simon Rattle (St Anne's)
- Leopold Stokowski (The Queen's) Academy Honorary Award 1941
- John Whitfield (Keble)

Organists

- Thomas Armstrong (Keble and Christ Church) principal Royal Academy of Music 1955–68
- Timothy Byram-Wigfield (Christ Church)
- John Clarke Whitfield
- E. T. Cook (The Queen's)
- Clive Driskill-Smith (Christ Church)
- George Job Elvey (New College)
- Jeremy Filsell (Keble)
- Philip Hayes (Magdalen)
- Christopher Herrick (Exeter)
- Max Kenworthy (Brasenose)
- John Keys (New College)
- Christopher Monckton (Magdalen)
- Sydney Nicholson (New College)
- Walter Parratt (Magdalen and Wadham)
- Simon Preston (Christ Church and Magdalen)

Pianists

- John Blakely
- Paul Crossley (Mansfield)
- Peter Hill (Christ Church)
- Ian Pace (The Queen's)
- Jean Redcliffe-Maud (Somerville)
- Peter Seivewright
- Llŷr Williams (The Queen's)

Singers

- John Mark Ainsley (Magdalen)
- Robin Blaze (Magdalen)
- Ian Bostridge (Corpus Christi)
- James Bowman (New College)
- Susan Gritton
- Emma Kirkby (Somerville)
- Robert Lloyd (Keble)
- Peter Pears (Hertford)
- Myfanwy Piper (St Hugh's)

Musicologists

- Barry Cooper (University)
- Edmund Fellowes (Oriel)
- Jonathan Freeman-Attwood (Christ Church) principal of the Royal Academy of Music 2008–
- Paul Hillier (Magdalen)
- Nicola LeFanu (St Hilda's)
- Robert Sherlaw Johnson (Worcester)
- Alan Tyson (All Souls)

Administration

- Tony Hall, Baron Hall of Birkenhead (Keble) chief executive Royal Opera House 2001–
- Nicholas Kenyon (Balliol) Contr Radio 3 1992–, dir Proms 1996–2000, Contr Proms, Live Events & TV Classical Music 2000–
- Anthony Russell-Roberts (New College) administrative director of the Royal Ballet 1983–

Didgeridoo

- Graham Wiggins

Jazz

- Bill Ashton
- Pat Fish (Patrick Huntrods) (Merton)
- Soweto Kinch (Hertford)

Country

- Kris Kristofferson (Merton)

Folk

- June Tabor (St Hugh's)

Rock and pop

- Mira Aroyo (attended but did not graduate)
- Edwin Congreave
- Guthrie Govan (attended but did not graduate)
- Myles MacInnes (Mylo) (Brasenose)
- Yannis Philippakis (St John's)
- Mike Ratledge (University)
- Mr Hudson

=== Museum and gallery directors ===
- Robert Anderson (St John's) director British Museum 1992–2002
- Thomas P. Campbell director Metropolitan Museum of Art, New York 2009–
- Kenneth Clark, Baron Clark of Saltwood (Trinity) director National Gallery 1933–46, surveyor King's Pictures 1934–44, chairman Arts Council 1953–60
- Henry Ellis (St John's) principal librarian British Museum 1827–56
- T. D. Kendrick (Oriel) director and principal librarian British Museum 1950–59
- Frederic G. Kenyon (Magdalen) director and principal librarian British Museum 1909–31
- Michael Levey (Exeter) director National Gallery 1973–86
- Neil MacGregor (New College) director National Gallery 1987–2002, director British Museum 2002–, chairman World Collections 2008–
- Edward Maunde Thompson (University) principal librarian British Museum 1888–98, director and principal librarian 1898–1909
- Nicholas Penny (Balliol) director National Gallery 2008–
- John Pope-Hennessy (Balliol) director Victoria and Albert Museum 1967–73, director and principal librarian British Museum 1974–76, director 1976–79
- John Wolfenden, Baron Wolfenden (Magdalen) V-C Reading Univ 1950–63, chmn Wolfenden Cttee 1954–57, chmn Univ Grants Cttee 1963–68, dir & Prin Lib Brit Mus 1969–74

=== Art and history of art ===
- Peter Bales (Gloucester Hall)
- Wendy Beckett (St Anne's)
- Edward Burne-Jones (Exeter)
- W. G. Collingwood (University)
- Vincent Cronin (Trinity)
- Andrew Graham-Dixon
- Robert Hewison (Brasenose)
- Bevis Hillier (Magdalen)
- Kurt Jackson (St Peter's)
- Martin Kemp (Trinity)
- Tom Phillips (St Catherine's)
- George Rickey (Balliol)
- John Ruskin (Corpus Christi)
- Desmond Shawe-Taylor (University)

=== Architecture ===
- Thomas Graham Jackson (Wadham)
- Edward James (Christ Church)
- John Martin Robinson
- Sacheverell Sitwell (Balliol)
- Christopher Wren (Wadham and All Souls)

== Academic disciplines ==
This includes:

- Law
- Theology and the Study of Religions
- Historians
- Classicists, Byzantinists, Archaeologists
- Modern Languages
- Philosophers
- Economists
- Geography
- Anthropology and ethnography
- Sociology
- Politics, political philosophy, and international relations
- Asian studies
- Mathematicians and statisticians
- Scientists
  - Naturalists, botanists, and zoologists
  - Medicine
  - Psychologists, psychiatrists, and physiologists of the brain
  - Chemists
  - Physicists and astronomers
    - Astronomers Royal
    - Other physicists and astronomers
  - Computers, electronics, and robotics
  - Engineering and agriculture
  - Geology
  - Meteorology

== Chefs and wine experts ==
- Oz Clarke (Pembroke)
- Hugh Fearnley-Whittingstall (St Peter's)
- Nigella Lawson (Lady Margaret Hall)
- Jancis Robinson (St Anne's)
- Rick Stein (New College)

== See also ==
- List of Rhodes Scholars
- List of vice-chancellors of the University of Oxford
- List of heads of houses of the University of Oxford
