= South Riding =

South Riding has several meanings:

- South Riding (book), a book from 1936 by Winifred Holtby, featuring a fictional South Riding of Yorkshire
- South Riding (film), a film from 1938 based on the novel
- South Riding, a thirteen-part ITV TV series from 1974 based on the novel
- South Riding (2011 TV series), a three-part BBC TV miniseries from 2011 based on the novel
- Tipperary South Riding, later called South Tipperary, a former county in Ireland
- The former South Riding of Lindsey in Lincolnshire, England
- South Riding, Virginia, United States
- South Riding (bus company), a bus company in Sheffield, South Yorkshire, England in the early 1990s; bought by Yorkshire Traction
