= Laufman =

Laufman is an Ashkenazi Jewish surname. Notable people with the surname include:

- Dudley Laufman (born 1930), American musician
- Ken Laufman (born 1932), Canadian ice hockey player

== See also ==
- Lautman
