= Bertholf =

Bertholf is a Dutch surname, originating from namesake area in Netherlands.

It may refer to:

- Guiliam Bertholf, voorleser.
- Robert Bertholf, author and professor at the University at Buffalo.
- Ellsworth P. Bertholf, Congressional Gold Medal recipient.
- Wallace Bertholf, commander of the USS Harrisburg.

== See also ==
- USCGC Bertholf (WMSL-750)
- Berthold
