= Saskia Hamilton =

American poet (1967–2023)

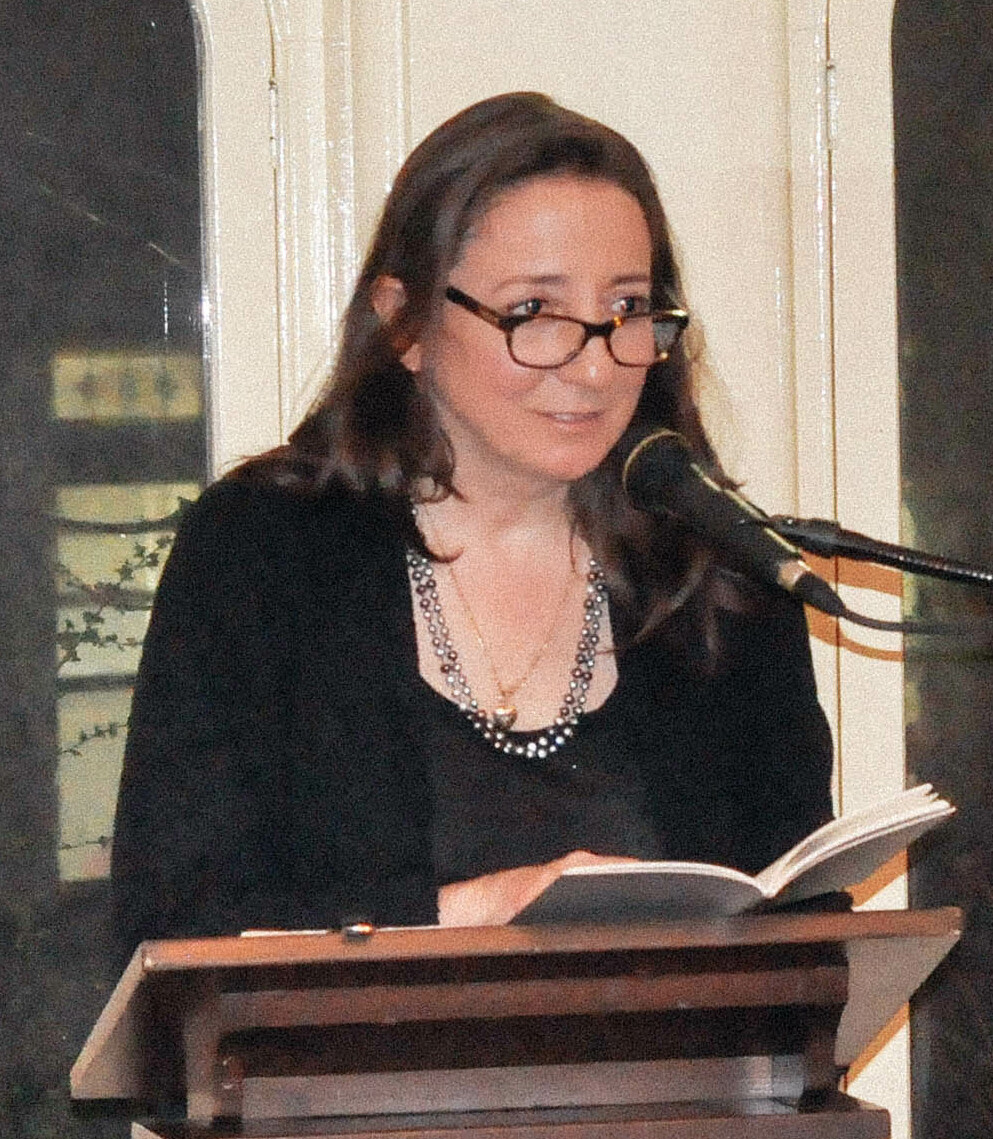
- Hamilton in 2016
- Born: Maria Saskia Hamilton; May 5, 1967; Washington, D.C., U.S.
- Died: June 7, 2023 (aged 56); New York City, U.S.
- Education: Kenyon College (BA); New York University (MA); Boston University (PhD)
- Occupations: Poet; editor; university administrator
- Children: 1
- Writing career
- Language: English

Maria Saskia Hamilton (May 5, 1967 – June 7, 2023) was an American poet, editor, and professor and university administrator at Barnard College. She published five collections of poetry, the final of which, All Souls, was posthumously published in September 2023. Her academic focus was largely on the American poet Robert Lowell; she edited several collections of the writings and personal correspondence of Lowell, Elizabeth Hardwick, and Elizabeth Bishop. Additionally, she served as the director of literary programs at the Lannan Foundation, as the Vice Provost for Academic Programs and Curriculum at Barnard College, and as an editor at The Paris Review and Literary Imagination.

Her work was recognized with awards such as the Pegasus Award for Poetry Criticism and the Morton N. Cohen Award. She held fellowships from the Poetry Foundation, the Radcliffe Institute for Advanced Study, the National Endowment for the Arts, and a Guggenheim Fellowship.

== Early life ==
Maria Saskia Hamilton was born in Washington, D.C., on May 5, 1967, to Elise Wiarda and John Andrew Hamilton Jr. Wiarda is an artist and therapist. When Wiarda was ages two to seven, she lived under Nazi occupation in Amsterdam. Elise Wiarda's grandparents were later honored as Righteous Among the Nations by the State of Israel for housing and hiding Hugo Sinzheimer and his wife. Andrew Hamilton was a writer and editor, who, when Saskia Hamilton was young, was a principal analyst at the Congressional Budget Office. He later became an editorial writer for The Post and Courier in Charleston, South Carolina. When Saskia was 12, her father re-married to Eliza Euretta Rathbone, an assistant curator at the National Gallery of Art at the time, later the chief curator of The Phillips Collection, and the daughter of Perry T. Rathbone. Hamilton stated that she grew up listening to poetry read by her father and grandmother, and started writing poetry seriously when she was about 18. She had four siblings. Saskia attended Georgetown Day School in D.C.

== Education and career ==
Hamilton graduated from Kenyon College with a B.A. in 1989. Soon after graduating, her work closed out the collection The Kenyon Poets: Celebrating the Fiftieth Anniversary of the Founding of The Kenyon Review, a compilation of poetry in honor of The Kenyon Review. That year, Hamilton was the winner of a Ruth Lilly and Dorothy Sargent Rosenberg Poetry Fellowship from the Poetry Foundation. Sponsored by Ruth Lilly, the fellowship included a US$15,000 prize. She used the fellowship to attend New York University, where she earned her M.A. in English and creative writing, graduating in 1991.

From there, Hamilton worked at the Folger Shakespeare Library in Washington, D.C., from 1992 to 1997. She then lived in Santa Fe, New Mexico where she was the associate director, later director, of literary programs at the Lannan Foundation, before moving to Cambridge, Massachusetts in 1999. She spent a year teaching at Kenyon College from 2000 to 2001. Her first poetry collection As for Dream was published by Graywolf Press during that time. She stated that the collection was "partially about watching people deal with illness and death in families, and dealing with the moment of death." She then taught for a year at Stonehill College from 2001 to 2002. She moved to Barnard College in New York City in 2002, where she continued to work until her death. She also received her Ph.D. from the Editorial Institute at Boston University.

In 2005, Hamilton published The Letters of Robert Lowell, a compilation of poet Robert Lowell's correspondence. The book was well received. Andrew Motion writing for The Guardian said, "Her selection, as far as one can judge, is excellent: it certainly gives a rounded picture of a marvellously jagged mind. [...] Best of all, her approach throughout is enthusiastic, as well as scholarly, and lets us see that even if Lowell wrote his letters in a way that's almost opposite to the way he wrote his poems (freely, and with hardly any revision), they nevertheless meet in a single concentration." That year, she also published two collections of her poetry: Divide These and Canal: New & Selected Poems, the latter of which featured some poems from her previous two collections and some new works. In 2008, Hamilton collaborated with Thomas Travisano in editing Words in Air, a collection of the correspondence between poets Elizabeth Bishop and Lowell from 1947 to Lowell's death in 1977.

Hamilton was a judge for the 2009 Griffin Poetry Prize. In 2012, she became co-editor for the journal Literary Imagination.

In 2014, Hamilton published her fourth collection of poetry, Corridor. David Orr writing for The New York Times and Dan Chiasson writing for The New Yorker both listed the book as one their top poetry books of the year.

Hamilton became Vice Provost for Academic Programs and Curriculum at Barnard College in July 2018. The next month, she joined The Paris Review as an advisory editor. In 2019, Hamilton published what would become her most discussed work: The Dolphin Letters, 1970–1979: Elizabeth Hardwick, Robert Lowell, and Their Circle and The Dolphin, Two Versions: 1972, 1973. The books jointly earned her the 2020 Pegasus Award for Poetry Criticism from the Poetry Foundation and The Dolphin Letters received the 2021 Morton N. Cohen Award from The Modern Language Association

Her final poetry collection, titled All Souls, was posthumously released in September 2023.

== Personal life and death ==
Hamilton's name is the title of the tenth track of the 2010 Ben Folds and Nick Hornby collaborative album Lonely Avenue; the song's lyrics are the thoughts of a character who has become obsessed with her based only on the sound of her name. She first met Folds and Hornby after the album's release, when she attended a performance at Housing Works Bookstore Cafe in Lower Manhattan in October 2010. Hamilton later hosted a conversation with Hornby at the Heyman Center at Columbia University in March 2013 as part of their Writing Lives Series.

Hamilton died in Manhattan on June 7, 2023, at age 56, from cancer. She had a son.

== Works ==
=== Poetry collections ===
- As for Dream: Poems (2001), Graywolf Press, ISBN 978-1-55597-316-2
- Divide These: Poems (2005), Graywolf Press, ISBN 978-1-55597-422-0
- Canal: New & Selected Poems 1993-2005 (2005), Arc Publications, ISBN 978-1-904614-15-9
- Corridor: Poems (2014), Graywolf Press, ISBN 978-1-55597-675-0
- All Souls: Poems (2023), Graywolf Press, ISBN 978-1-64445-263-9

=== As editor ===
- The Letters of Robert Lowell (2005), Ed. by Saskia Hamilton, Published by Farrar, Straus and Giroux, ISBN 978-0-374-53034-1
- Words in Air: The Complete Correspondence Between Elizabeth Bishop and Robert Lowell (2008), Ed. by Thomas Travisano and Saskia Hamilton, Published by Macmillan, ISBN 9780374531898
- Poems / Prose (2011), By Elizabeth Bishop, Ed. by Saskia Hamilton, Published by Farrar, Straus and Giroux, ISBN 0374125589
- The Dolphin Letters, 1970–1979: Elizabeth Hardwick, Robert Lowell, and Their Circle (2019), By Elizabeth Hardwick and Robert Lowell, Ed. by Saskia Hamilton, Published by Farrar, Straus and Giroux, ISBN 9780374141264
- The Dolphin, Two Versions: 1972, 1973 (2019), By Robert Lowell, Ed. by Saskia Hamilton, Published by Farrar, Straus and Giroux, ISBN 978-0374538279
- Memories of Our Childhood in Wartime Amsterdam 1940-1945 (2022), By Claar Hugenholtz-Wiarda, Louise van Wassenaer-Wiarda, and Elise Wiarda, Ed. by Saskia Hamilton, Self-published, ISBN 9798210608192

=== As contributor ===
- The Kenyon Poets: Celebrating the Fiftieth Anniversary of the Founding of The Kenyon Review (1989), Ed. by Galbraith M. Crump, ISBN 978-0962325007
- Joining Music with Reason: 34 Poets, British and American (2010), Ed. by Christopher Ricks, ISBN 978-1-904130-40-6

== Awards ==
- 1989 Ruth Lilly and Dorothy Sargent Rosenberg Poetry Fellowship from the Poetry Foundation
- Radcliffe Institute for Advanced Study Fellowship
- National Endowment for the Arts Fellowship
- 2009 Guggenheim Fellowship
- 2020 Pegasus Award for Poetry Criticism from the Poetry Foundation
- 2021 Arts and Letters Awards in Literature from The American Academy of Arts and Letters
- 2021 Morton N. Cohen Award from The Modern Language Association
