= Lyn Brockway =

American painter

Lyn Brockway (born 1929) is an American painter who was active in the San Francisco abstract expressionism movement in the 1950s.

== Biography ==
Having grown up in San Francisco, Lyn Brockway went on to attend the University of California (Berkeley) and took courses at the California School of Fine Arts (now San Francisco Art Institute). In the late 1940s, Brockway met Robert Duncan and the artist Jess, and became active in numerous exhibitions, poetry gatherings, and creative endeavors through their circle. Her work is known for its figurative quality, use of bright, hallucinatory colors, rich compositions, and a romanticism emblematic of much work during the San Francisco Renaissance. Some of her noble works include Breakfast in a Paris Lodging (1951), Aunt at Solitaire (1953), and Wild Flowers (1954). She went on to raise a family, following which her art practice was discontinued.

== Museum collections ==
- The Grey Art Gallery, New York City, NY
- San Francisco Museum of Modern Art, San Francisco, CA
- Morris and Helen Belkin Art Gallery, Vancouver, BC
