= Robert Bertholf =

American author and professor (1940–2016)

Robert J. Bertholf (November 5, 1940 – February 19, 2016) was an author and professor at Kent State University, and the University at Buffalo. He was the Charles D. Abbott Scholar-In-Residence and former curator of The Poetry Collection at Buffalo.

Bertholf graduated from Bowdoin College and received a masters and doctorate under A. Kingsley Weatherhead at the University of Oregon. In 1968, Bertholf joined the English Department faculty at Kent State University in Kent, Ohio. Bertholf lead a cadre of young professors at the university, and was largely responsible for bringing an amazing troupe of poets and intellectuals as visiting professors or lecturers to Kent, including Allen Ginsberg, Robert Duncan, Robert Creeley, Joel Oppenheimer, Harvey Bialy, Joanne Kyger and Ed Dorn.

Devo founders Bob Lewis and Gerald Casale were students of Bertholf's at Kent, and Bertholf supported the nascent musical group by inviting them to perform at the university's creative arts festivals in 1973 and 1974.

Bertholf later moved to Buffalo, New York, where he was the curator of the renowned poetry collection at the State University at Buffalo, and then the Charles D. Abbott Scholar and Professor. Bertholf has written innumerable articles and books about American poets and poetry, including Wallace Stevens, Robert Duncan, Charles Olson, and other Black Mountain poets like Oppenheimer, Creeley and Dorn. He received the Morton N. Cohen Award from the Modern Language Association with Albert Gelpi in 2003.

After leaving Buffalo, Bertholf moved to Austin, Texas, where he continued writing books and articles on American poets.

== Works ==
=== As author ===
- A Descriptive Catalog of the Private Library of Thomas B. Lockwood (1983)
- Robert Duncan, A Descriptive Bibliography (1986)
- Remembering Joel Oppenheimer (2005)

=== As editor ===
- Credences (1977?-?)
- Robert Duncan, Scales of the Marvelous (with Ian Reid) (1980)
- William Blake and the Moderns (1982)
- Lorine Neidecker, From This Condensery (1985)
- Julian Stanczak: Decades of Light (additional text by Harry Rand and Rudolf Arnheim)(1990)
- A Great Admiration, H.D./Robert Duncan Correspondence 1950-1961 (1991)
- Jess, a Grand Collage, 1951-1993 (with Michael Auping and Michael Palmer)(1993)
- Robert Duncan, Selected Poems (1993, new edition 1997)
- Robert Duncan, A Selected Prose 1995!
- Joel Oppenheimer, Drawing From Life (with David Landrey)(1997)
- Joel Oppenheimer, Collected Later Poems (1998)
- The Letters of Robert Duncan and Denise Levertov (with Albert Gelpi)(2003)
