= South Riding (film) =

1938 film

- Directed by: Victor Saville
- Written by: Ian Dalrymple; Donald Bull
- Based on: novel South Riding by Winifred Holtby
- Produced by: Alexander Korda; Stanley Haynes; Victor Saville
- Starring: Edna Best; Ralph Richardson; Edmund Gwenn; Ann Todd
- Cinematography: Harry Stradling Sr.
- Edited by: Hugh Stewart
- Music by: Richard Addinsell
- Production companies: Victor Saville Productions; London Film Productions
- Distributed by: United Artists
- Release date: 26 August 1938 (UK)
- Running time: 85 mins
- Country: United Kingdom
- Language: English

South Riding is a 1938 British drama film directed by Victor Saville and produced by Alexander Korda, starring Edna Best, Ralph Richardson, Edmund Gwenn and Ann Todd. It was written by Ian Dalrymple and Donald Bull based on the 1936 novel South Riding by Winifred Holtby, and was the film debut of 14-year-old Glynis Johns. The BBC produced a TV adaptation in 2011.

== Plot ==
A squire becomes involved in local politics.

== Cast ==
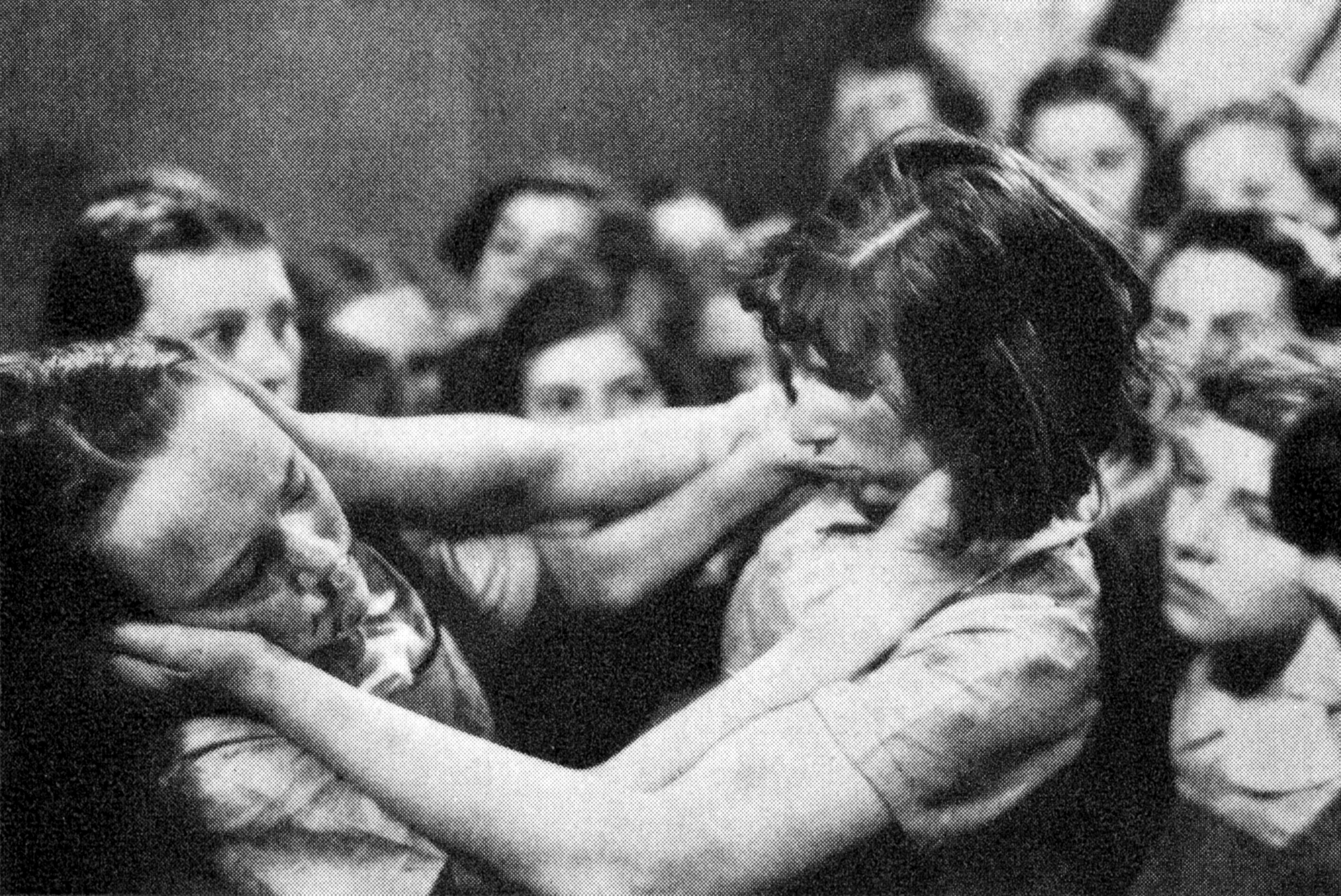
A fight breaks out at school between Midge Carne (Glynis Johns, left) and Lydia Holly (Joan Ellum) in South Riding

- Edna Best as Sarah Burton
- Ralph Richardson as Robert Carne
- Edmund Gwenn as Alfred Huggins
- Ann Todd as Madge Carne
- Marie Lohr as Mrs. Beddows
- Milton Rosmer as Alderman Snaith
- John Clements as Joe Astell
- Edward Lexy as Mr. Holly
- Joan Ellum as Lydia Holly
- Glynis Johns as Midge Carne
- Josephine Wilson as Mrs. Holly
- Gus McNaughton as Tadman
- Herbert Lomas as Castle
- Peggy Novak as Bessie Warbuckle
- Lewis Casson as Lord Sedgmire
- Felix Aylmer as Chairman of Council
- Jean Cadell as Miss Dry
- Skelton Knaggs as Reginald Aythorne

== Production ==
Hugh Stewart who edited it called it "one of the very best scripts ever written".

== Reception ==
=== Box office ===
Kinematograph Weekly reported the film did well at the British box office in August 1938.

=== Critical ===
The Monthly Film Bulletin wrote: "There is such a wealth of excellent acting in the film, the story in itself is so well worth reproducing and in the main so well produced, that it is the more regrettable that the treatment of the end (and also of one or two minor episodes) is shoddy and perfunctory. The direction is excellent both for characterisation and for tempo; the camerawork is smooth and efficient, and shows an appreciation of pictorial values both in interiors and exteriors; the settings are all that could be desired. Nine-tenths of the film are so good as to make it well worth seeing as a well-acted and well-produced story of the realities of English life."

TV Guide wrote, "Not an altogether satisfying love story, it is more interesting as a portrait of pre-WW II life in the country. Excellent sets by Meerson and well shot by Stradling."

Time Out wrote, "Saville carries Winifred Holtby's tart, witty exposé of Yorkshire power politics to the screen with breathtaking, and totally unexpected, panache."

Leonard Maltin called it "Smoothly made and superbly acted by a flawless cast."
