= Rosemary Haughton =

British Catholic lay theologian (1927–2024)

Rosemary Elena Konradin Haughton (née Luling, 13 April 1927 – 9 May 2024) was a British Catholic lay theologian, who lived in the United States over a period of thirty years.

== Life and career ==
Rosemary Luling was born in London on 13 April 1927, the daughter of Peter Luling and the novelist Sylvia Thompson Luling. She had two sisters, Dr. Virginia Luling (died 2013), and Elizabeth Dooley (née Luling; died 1962). She attended Farnham Girls' Grammar School, Queen's College, London, and the Slade School of Fine Art. She married Algernon Haughton in 1948; the couple had 12 children, including two foster children. Algy Haughton died in Edinburgh in 2008.

Rosemary Haughton wrote over 35 books; her daughter wrote of her that "she had a great deal to say on Catholic culture, feminist spirituality, marriage and sexuality, and soon she also had a wide and very interested audience". She was influenced by Thomas Merton, whom she met and corresponded with.

Rosemary and Algernon Haughton founded the intentional community of Lothlorien in Dumfries and Galloway, Scotland in the 1970s. Since 1989 this community has been managed by ROKPA International. Haughton was also a founder member of the Wellspring House in Gloucester, Massachusetts.

Haughton celebrated and affirmed her long-standing partnership with Nancy (Winifred) Schwoyer on 4 June 2011, with a civil ceremony held at Halifax Town Hall. They lived together in Heptonstall, Yorkshire. Rosemary Haughton died at home on 9 May 2024, at the age of 97.

== Publications ==
- On Trying to Be Human
- The Passionate God
- The Catholic Thing
- The Transformation of Man
- The Drama of Salvation
- The Tower That Fell
- Images for Change
- Tales from Eternity
- Elizabeth's Greetings
- Song in a Strange Land
- The Re-Creation of Eve
- The Theology of Experience
- Tales from Eternity: The World of Faerie and the Spiritual Search

== Sources ==
- Ryan, Eilish (1997). Rosemary Haughton: Witness to Hope. Rowman & Littlefield. ISBN 978-1-55612-860-8.
- International Who's Who (2012; 75th edition), p. 809. Routledge: London & New York; ISBN 978-1-85743-607-5.
