= Lautman =

Lautman is a surname. Notable people with the surname include:

- Albert Lautman (1908–1944), French mathematical philosopher
- Robert C. Lautman (1923–2009), American architectural photographer
- Rüdiger Lautmann (born 1935), German sociologist
- Victoria Lautman, American broadcast journalist

== See also ==
Adi Lautman Interdisciplinary Program for Outstanding Students
