= Jess Collins =

American artist (1923–2004)

- Born: Burgess Franklin Collins; August 6, 1923; Long Beach, California
- Died: January 2, 2004 (aged 80)
- Education: San Francisco Art Institute
- Known for: Visual art
- Partner: Robert Duncan

Jess Collins (August 6, 1923 – January 2, 2004), known today simply as Jess, was an American visual artist.

== Life and career ==
Jess was born Burgess Franklin Collins in Long Beach, California. He was drafted into the military and worked on the production of plutonium for the Manhattan Project. After his discharge in 1946, Jess worked at the Hanford Atomic Energy Project in Richland, Washington, and painted in his spare time, but his dismay at the threat of atomic weapons led him to abandon his scientific career and focus on his art.

In 1949, Jess enrolled in the California School of the Arts (subsequently the San Francisco Art Institute) where he studied under Clyfford Still, David Park, Hassel Smith, and Edward Corbett. He received a BFA degree in 1951. in 1949 he broke with his family, and thereafter referred to himself simply as "Jess."

He met Robert Duncan in 1950 and began a relationship with the poet that lasted for 37 years until Duncan's death in 1988. The two men lived and worked for decades from their historic Victorian home in the Mission District, "a wonderland of an old house, filled to the roof with art," more than 5,000 books, and 5,300 music records. Through Duncan and the painter Lyn Brockway he became active in numerous exhibitions, poetry gatherings, and creative endeavors.

In 1952, in San Francisco, Jess, with Duncan and painter Harry Jacobus, opened the King Ubu Gallery, which became an important venue for alternative art and which remained so when, in 1954, poet Jack Spicer reopened the space as the Six Gallery.

In the late 1950s, Jess filled Pauline Kael's home on Oregon Street in Berkeley, California, with fantastical murals which still adorn the walls today.

Many of Jess's works have themes drawn from chemistry, alchemy, the occult, and male beauty, including a series of paintings called Translations (1959–1976) which is done with heavily laid-on paint in a paint-by-number style. Jess also created elaborate collages using old book illustrations and comic strips (particularly, the strip Dick Tracy, which he used to make his own strip Tricky Cad).

Art citic Holland Cotter identifies three distinct facets of Jess's artistic oeuvre.

He started out doing shadowy abstract paintings, influenced by his teacher, Edward Corbett...It wasn’t long before Jess developed a technique that was better suited to his gift for meditative, labor-intensive precision: paintings with thickly layered surfaces from which images seemed to be incised...Jess is best known for his collages, which he called paste-ups: staggeringly intricate symbolic narratives pieced together from bits of scientific treatises, muscle magazines, art history books, cartoons and popular periodicals like Life and Time.

Harry Parker, director of the Fine Arts Museums of San Francisco, called Jess "the essential San Francisco artist. His political views and his quirky artistic style, his association with the poetry scene, his advocacy of gay rights—all the issues that came into his work were so representative of the San Francisco perspective. Only here could you imagine work like his being made."

The year 2019 saw the publication of The Householders: Robert Duncan and Jess by Tara McDowell (MIT Press), the first book-length study of the couple, a work of both biography and critical analysis, and, in the words of the press release, "a love story."

== Exhibitions ==
At mid-career, Jess's art received international attention with solo exhibitions at The Museum of Modern Art in New York (1974), the Galleria Odyssia in Rome (1975), the Wadsworth Atheneum (1975), the Dallas Museum of Fine Arts (1977), the Berkeley Art Museum (1980), and The Arts Club of Chicago (1981).

In 1983-84, the John and Mable Ringling Museum of Art in Sarasota, Florida mounted the exhibition Jess, Paste-Ups (and Assemblies), 1951-1983 and published a companion book.

A Jess retrospective, Jess: A Grand Collage, 1951–1993, toured the United States in 1993 to 1994. The companion book featured essays by contributors including poet Michael Palmer, who wrote an extended piece on Jess's monumental Narkissos, a complexly rendered 70"x60" drawing (graphite and gouache on cut and pasted paper) acquired in 1996 by the San Francisco Museum of Modern Art.

In 2004, three details from Jess's monumental collage Arkadia's Last Resort; or, Fête Champêtre Up Mnemosyne Creek were used by Faithless to illustrate their release "I Want More."

From 2007 to 2009, the posthumous traveling exhibition Jess: To and From the Printed Page included paintings from his Translations series together with many of his collages and designs, as well as the books and magazines in which they were reproduced. The exhibition appeared at the San Jose Museum of Art, the Madison Museum of Contemporary Art, the Pasadena Museum of California Art, the Harry Ransom Center at the University of Texas at Austin, the Douglas F. Cooley Gallery at Reed College, the University of Iowa Stanley Museum of Art, and the Rollins Museum of Art at Rollins College.

In 2014 and 2015, the traveling exhibition An Opening of the Field: Jess, Robert Duncan, and Their Circle appeared at the Grey Art Gallery at New York University, the Katzen Arts Center at American University in Washington, D.C., and the Pasadena Museum of California Art. As Holland Cotter wrote in The New York Times, the exhibition explored what it was like for the couple to be "young, gifted, and odd" in San Francisco after World War II. "Espousers of the power of the imagination," Jess and Duncan "created a self-contained world, and their friends were welcomed in." Combining 45 of the couple's own works with 85 works by roughly 30 of their close associates, the show shed light on what was less a movement than a "psychic collaboration, the communal property of lovers, spouses, and friends....Maybe the sense of unity [in the exhibition] comes from the presence of a marriage at its center, a same-sex union that lasted almost 40 years."

In 2019, the San Francisco Museum of Modern Art mounted the show Mythos, Psyche, Eros: Jess and California, which paired paintings and collages "that privileged the mystical, whimsical, and absurd" by "one of San Francisco’s most enigmatic figures...with pieces by other California artists, who together reflect the West Coast’s unusual romantic legacy."

== In museum collections ==
- Art Institute of Chicago, Chicago, IL
- Berkeley Art Museum and Pacific Film Archive, Berkeley, CA
- Crocker Art Museum, Sacramento, CA
- Dallas Museum of Art, Dallas, TX
- Di Rosa Center for Contemporary Art, Napa, CA
- Fine Arts Museums of San Francisco, San Francisco, CA (28 works)
- Hirshhorn Museum and Sculpture Garden, Washington, D.C.
- Metropolitan Museum of Art, New York City, NY
- Museum of Contemporary Art, Chicago, IL
- Museum of Modern Art, New York City, NY
- National Gallery of Art, Washington, D.C.
- Oakland Museum of California, Oakland, CA
- Philadelphia Museum of Art, Philadelphia, PA
- San Francisco Museum of Modern Art, San Francisco, CA
- Whitney Museum of American Art, New York City, NY

== Papers ==
The Jess Papers collection is stored at the Bancroft Library at the University of California, Berkeley, and consists of correspondence, manuscripts, flyers, announcements, clippings, writings, artwork, and miscellaneous materials.

== Publications ==
- Jess, Paste Ups (and Assemblies), 1951-1983, exhibition catalogue, text by Michael Auping. John and Mable Ringling Museum of Art, 1983.
- Jess: A Grand Collage, 1951-1993, exhibition catalogue. Buffalo Fine Arts/Albright Knox Art Gallery, 1993. ISBN 0-914782-85-1
- Jess: To and From the Printed Page, exhibition catalogue, text by John Ashbery, Thomas Evans, and Lisa Jarnot. Independent Curators International, 2007. ISBN 0-916365-75-1
- O! Tricky Cad & Other Jessoterica, edited by Michael Duncan. Siglio, 2012. ISBN 978-1-938221-00-2
