= List of University of Oxford people in sport, exploration, and adventuring =

This is a list of people from the University of Oxford involved in sport, exploration, and adventuring. Many were students at one (or more) of the colleges of the University and others held fellowships at a college.

This list forms part of a series of lists of people associated with the University of Oxford – for other lists, please see the main article List of University of Oxford people.

== List of sports people ==
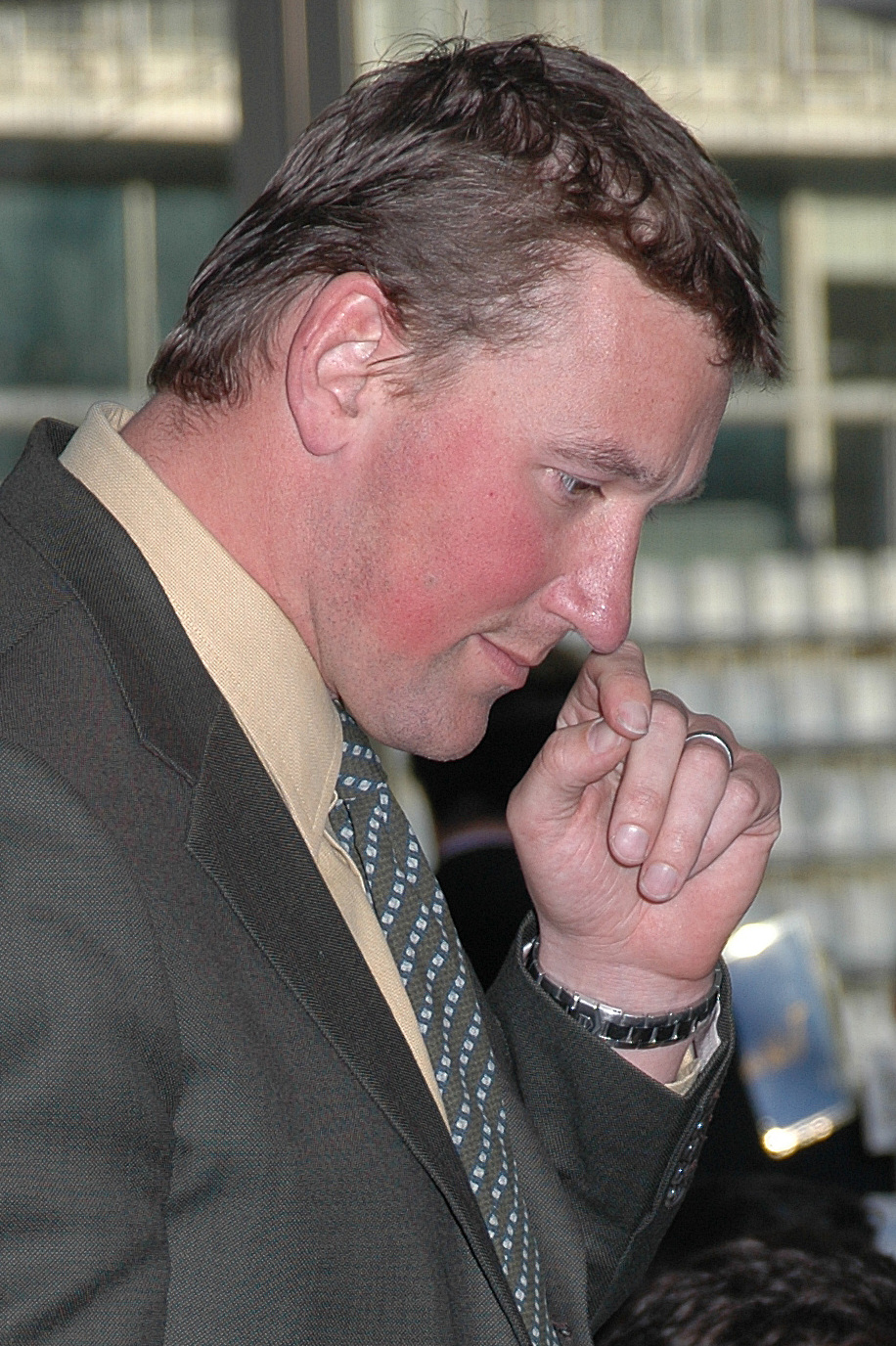
Matthew Pinsent

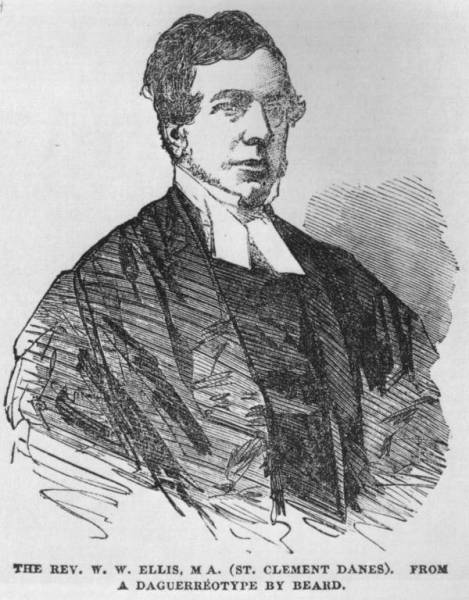
William Webb-Ellis

- James Allen (Lady Margaret Hall)
- Harry Altham
- John Bain (1854 – 1929), England footballer and 1877 FA Cup Finalist
- Roger Bannister (1929–2018), (Exeter and Merton)
- Stuart Barnes (St Edmund Hall)
- Imran Khan (Keble College)
- Paul Bennett (Kellogg College), Olympics gold medalist
- Francis Birley (University) Three-times winner of the FA Cup in the 1870s
- Michael Blomquist (St Peter's)
- Bernard Bosanquet
- Tom Bourdillon (Balliol)
- Robin Bourne-Taylor (Christ Church)
- Bill Bradley (Worcester)
- Charles Wreford-Brown (Oriel)
- Clarence Bruce, 3rd Baron Aberdare (New College)
- John Cyril Campbell, player and first football coach of Panathinaikos
- Ed Coode (Keble)
- Oliver Cook (Christ Church)
- Steph Cook (Lincoln)
- Colin Cowdrey, Baron Cowdrey of Tonbridge (Brasenose)
- Gerry Crutchley President of Middlesex CCC 1958-62
- Jamie Dalrymple (St Peter's)
- Simon Danielli (Scotland Rugby International) (Trinity)
- Rosamund Dashwood (Somerville)
- Christopher Davidge Gold medallist in rowing at the 1962 British Empire and Commonwealth Games
- Martin Donnelly
- Hugh Edwards (Christ Church)
- Jason Flickinger (Keble)
- R. E. Foster
- Tim Foster MBE (St Cross)
- Fiona Freckleton (Somerville)
- C. B. Fry (Wadham)
- Darren Gerard, cricketer
- Jennifer Goldsack (Somerville)
- Luka Grubor (Somerville)
- George Harris, 4th Baron Harris
- David Hemery (St Catherine's)
- Simon Hollingsworth (Exeter)
- Chris Hollins
- David Humphreys
- Douglas Jardine
- Malcolm Jardine
- Allan Jay MBE (1931—), world champion and five-time-Olympian foil and épée fencer
- Lauren Jeska, transgender fell-runner convicted of attempted murder
- Brian Johnston (New College)
- David Kirk (Worcester)
- Paul Klenerman (born 1963), Olympic sabre fencer
- Sandra Landy (1938-2017) international contract bridge player for England and for Great Britain; world champion 1981
- Sophie Le Marchand (Somerville)
- Christopher Liwski (St Catherine's)
- Jack Lovelock (Exeter) gold medal British Empire Games 1934, gold medal Olympic Games 1936
- Joseph von Maltzahn (Kellogg)
- Lucas McGee (Oriel)
- Tom McMillen (University)
- Alan Melville
- Max Mosley (Christ Church) President of the Fédération Internationale de l'Automobile 1993-
- John Nunn (Oriel) Chess Grandmaster ranked =9th in the world in 1985
- Anton Oliver (Worcester)
- Cuthbert Ottaway (Brasenose)
- Iftikhar Ali Khan Pataudi
- Mansoor Ali Khan Pataudi
- John Misha Petkevich
- Sir Matthew Pinsent CBE (St Catherine's)
- Ronald Poulton-Palmer (Balliol)
- Pete Reed (Wolfson and Oriel)
- Patricia Reid (Somerville)
- Joe Roff (Harris Manchester)
- Myron Rolle
- Mary Russell Vick (Somerville)
- James Schroder (Christ Church)
- Brough Scott (Corpus Christi)
- Jonathan Searle MBE (Christ Church)
- Smit Singh (Somerville)
- Dorjana Širola (Somerville)
- Colin Smith (St Catherine's)
- M. J. K. Smith
- John J. Tigert (Pembroke)
- Claire Tomlinson (Somerville)
- Andrew Triggs Hodge (St Catherine's)
- Dick Twining President of Middlesex CCC 1950–57, President Marylebone Cricket Club 1964–65
- Sir Pelham Warner
- William Webb-Ellis (Brasenose)
- Matthew Wells (Balliol)
- Jacob Wetzel (Linacre)
- Barney Williams (Jesus)
- Buffy-Lynne Williams (St Hugh's)
- Zoe de Toledo (Harris Manchester)

== Adventurers and explorers ==
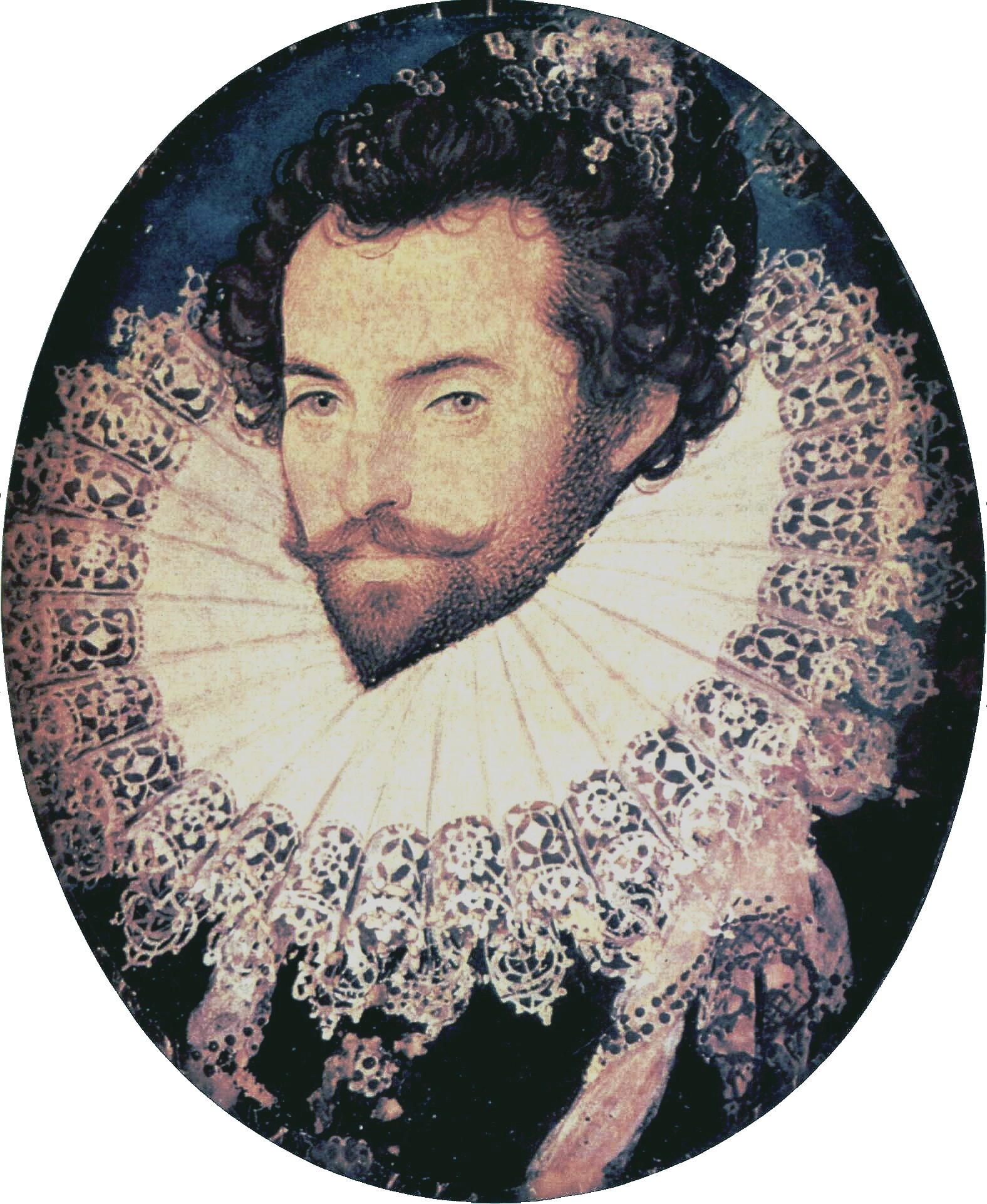
Walter Raleigh

- Gertrude Bell (Lady Margaret Hall)
- Apsley Cherry-Garrard (Christ Church)
- Richard Francis Burton (Trinity)
- Thomas Coryat (Gloucester Hall)
- Peter Fleming (Christ Church)
- Emily Georgiana Kemp (Somerville)
- T. E. Lawrence (Lawrence of Arabia) (Jesus and All Souls)
- Walter Raleigh (Oriel)
- Cecil Rhodes (Oriel)
- Katherine Routledge (Somerville)
- Andrew Irvine (Merton)
- Alex Hibbert (St Hugh's)

== See also ==
- Other names can be found Sport in Oxford, as well as its subcategories, especially Rowing in Oxford, Oxford University cricketers, and Oxford University AFC players
