= Robert Duncan (poet) =

American poet (1919–1988)

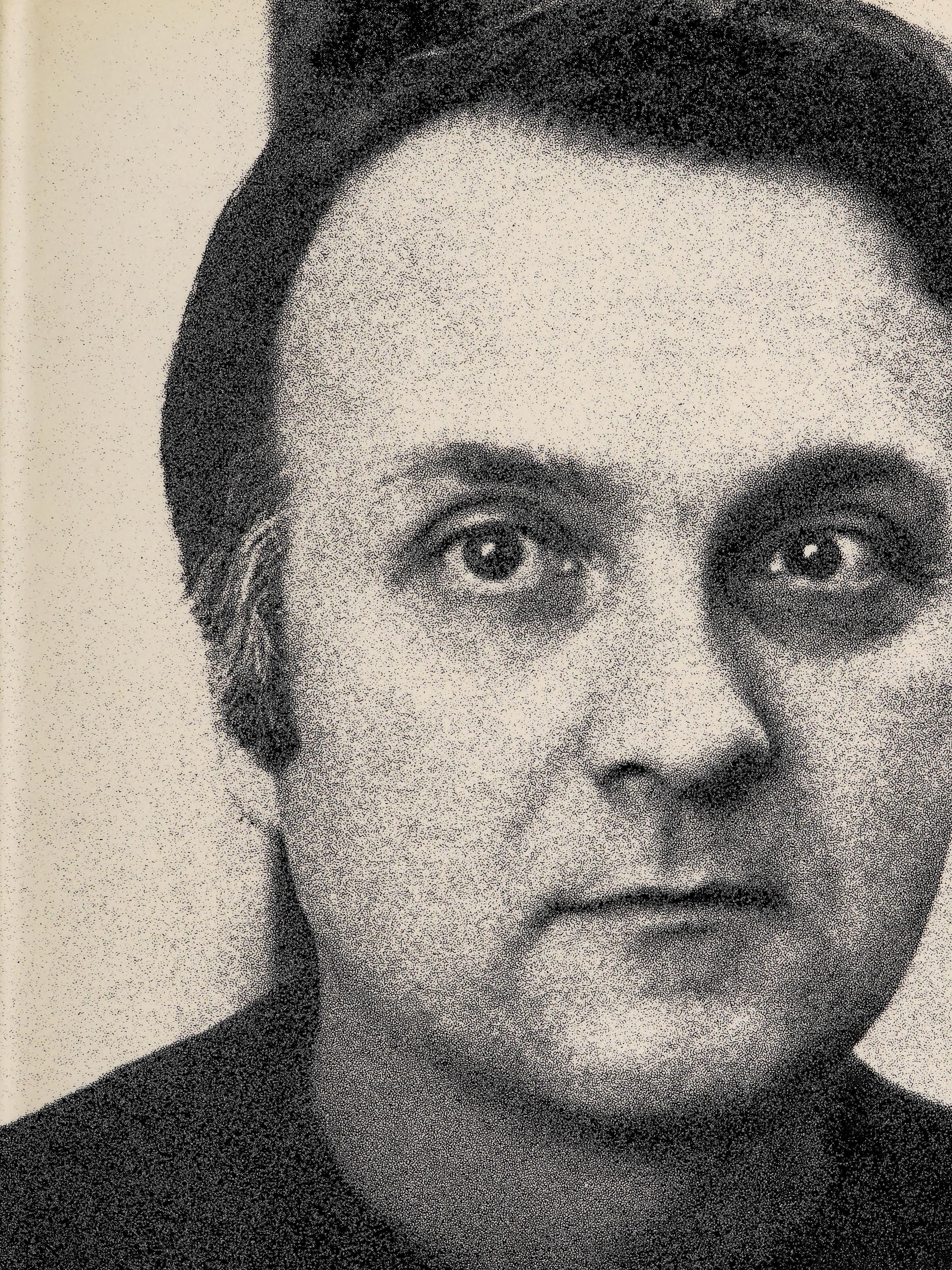
Robert Duncan

Robert Edward Duncan (January 7, 1919 – February 3, 1988) was an American poet and a devotee of Hilda "H.D." Doolittle and the Western esoteric tradition who spent most of his career in and around San Francisco. Though associated with any number of literary traditions and schools, Duncan is often identified with the poets of the New American Poetry and Black Mountain College. Duncan saw his work as emerging especially from the tradition of Ezra Pound, William Carlos Williams and D. H. Lawrence. Duncan was a key figure in the San Francisco Renaissance.

== Overview ==
As a poet and intellectual, Duncan's presence was felt across many facets of popular culture. His name is prominent in the history of pre-Stonewall gay culture and in the emergence of bohemian socialist communities of the 1930s and 1940s, in the Beat Generation, and in the cultural and political upheaval of the 1960s, influencing occult and gnostic circles of the time. During the later part of his life, Duncan's work, published by City Lights and New Directions, came to be distributed worldwide, and his influence as a poet is evident today in both mainstream and avant-garde writing.

== Early life and education ==
Duncan was born in Oakland, California, as Edward Howard Duncan Jr. His mother, Marguerite Pearl Duncan, had died in his childbirth. He was her tenth child and the delivery was at home to avoid the risks of contracting the so-called Spanish influenza at a medical facility. Duncan's father was unable to afford him, so in 1920 he was adopted by Edwin and Minnehaha Symmes, a family of devout Theosophists. They renamed him Robert Edward Symmes in honor of a family friend.

The Symmeses had begun planning for the child's arrival long prior to his adoption. There were terms for his adoption that had to be met: he had to be born at the time and place appointed by the astrologers, his mother was to die shortly after giving birth, and he was to be of Anglo-Saxon Protestant descent. His childhood was stable, and his parents were popular and social members of their community—Edwin was a prominent architect and Minnehaha devoted much of her time to volunteering and serving on committees. He grew up surrounded by the occult in one form or another; he was well aware of the circumstances of his fated birth and adoption and his parents carefully interpreted his dreams. The family adopted a second child, Barbara Eleanor Symmes, in 1920. She was born one year minus one day after Duncan, on January 6, 1920.

After the death of his adopted father in 1936, Duncan started studying at the University of California, Berkeley. He began writing poems inspired in part by his left wing politics and acquired a reputation as a bohemian. His friends and influences included Mary and Lilli Fabilli, Virginia Admiral, and Pauline Kael, among others.

In 1938, he briefly attended Black Mountain College, but left after a dispute with faculty over the Spanish Civil War.

== Duncan and homosexuality ==
Long before it was safe to do so, Duncan "came out" in both his personal and public lives. In 1944, Dwight Macdonald's politics published Duncan's still-controversial article, "The Homosexual in Society." This caused John Crowe Ransom to withdraw Duncan's [poem] "African Elegy" from its scheduled publication in the Kenyon Review.

– Michael Palmer

In 1938, while a sophomore at Berkeley, Duncan met graduate student Ned Fahs at a dance, and the two entered into Duncan's first recorded homosexual relationship, which biographer Ekbert Faas describes as "marriage-like". When Fahs graduated, Duncan followed him to Philadelphia, and the couple lived together first there and then in New York. They lived separately while Duncan attended Black Mountain College; by 1940, they were living together again, in Annapolis. The relationship ended not long after, and Fahs married a woman in 1941. Duncan continued to write poetry about Fahs for another twenty years.

In 1941 Duncan was drafted and declared his homosexuality to get discharged. In 1943, he had his first heterosexual relationship, which ended in a short, disastrous marriage. In 1944 Duncan had a relationship with the abstract expressionist painter Robert De Niro Sr.

Duncan's name figures prominently in the history of pre-Stonewall gay culture. In 1944, Duncan wrote the landmark essay "The Homosexual in Society." The essay, in which Duncan compared the plight of homosexuals with that of African Americans and Jews, was published in Dwight Macdonald's journal politics. Duncan's essay is considered a pioneering treatise on the experience of homosexuals in American society given its appearance a full decade before any organized gay rights movement (Mattachine Society). It made Duncan the first prominent American to reveal his homosexuality.

After the end of World War II, Duncan returned to the Bay Area, where he met the young Gerald M. Ackerman. The two entered into a relationship, living together in a boardinghouse in Berkeley, but broke up after a year. In 1950, Duncan met the artist Jess Collins, and in January 1951 the two men took marriage vows and moved in together. The two men collaborated on creative projects throughout their partnership, which lasted until Duncan's death 37 years later.

== San Francisco ==
Duncan returned to San Francisco in 1945 and was befriended by Helen Adam, Madeline Gleason, Lyn Brockway, and Kenneth Rexroth (with whom he had been in correspondence for some time). He returned to Berkeley to study Medieval and Renaissance literature and cultivated a reputation as a shamanistic figure in San Francisco poetry and artistic circles. His first book, Heavenly City Earthly City, was published by Bern Porter in 1947. In the early 1950s he started publishing in Cid Corman's Origin and the Black Mountain Review and in 1956 he spent a time teaching at the Black Mountain College.

== Mature works ==
During the 1960s, Duncan achieved considerable artistic and critical success with three books; The Opening of the Field (1960), Roots and Branches (1969), and Bending the Bow (1968). These are generally considered to be his most significant works. His poetry is modernist in its preference for the impersonal, mythic, and hieratic, but Romantic in its privileging of the organic, the irrational and primordial, the not-yet-articulate blindly making its way into language like salmon running upstream:

Neither our vices nor our virtues
further the poem. "They came up
and died
just like they do every year
on the rocks.

The poem
feeds upon thought, feeling, impulse,
to breed itself,
a spiritual urgency at the dark ladders leaping.

The Opening of the Field begins with "Often I Am Permitted to Return to a Meadow", suggesting one interpretation of "Field" in the title. The book includes short lyric poems, a recurring sequence of prose poems called "The Structure of Rime," and a long poem called "Poem Beginning with a Line by Pindar". The long poem draws materials from Pindar, Francisco Goya, Walt Whitman, Ezra Pound, Charles Olson, and the myth of Cupid and Psyche into an extended visionary and ecstatic fugue in the mode of Pound's Pisan Cantos. After Bending the Bow, Duncan vowed to avoid the distraction of publication for fifteen years. His friend and fellow poet Michael Palmer writes about this time in his essay "Ground Work: On Robert Duncan":

The story is well-known in poetry circles: around 1968, disgusted by his difficulties with publishers and by what he perceived as the careerist strategies of many poets, Duncan vowed not to publish a new collection for fifteen years. (There would be chapbooks along the way.) He felt that this decision would free him to listen to the demands of his (supremely demanding) poetics and would liberate the architecture of his work from all compromised considerations. ... It was not until 1984 that Ground Work I: Before the War appeared, for which he won the National Poetry Award, to be followed in February 1988, the month of his death, by Ground Work II: In the Dark.

His correspondence with the British academic and poet Eric Mottram, which began in 1971 and continued through to 1986, is published in The Unruly Garden: Robert Duncan and Eric Mottram, Letters and Essays (Peter Lang), edited by Amy Evans Bauer and Shamoon Zamir.

== Collected writings ==
The Collected Writings of Robert Duncan began appearing in January 2011 from the University of California Press.

- Volume One, The H.D. Book (2011). ISBN 9780520272620.
- Volume Two, The Collected Early Poems and Plays (2019). ISBN 9780520324855.
- Volume Three, The Collected Later Poems and Plays (2019). ISBN 9780520324862.
- Volume Four,The Collected Essays and Other Prose (2019). ISBN 9780520324848.

The press planned to publish a total of six volumes. However, only four were published with the press confirming that "no further volumes will be issued."

== Selected bibliography ==
- Selected Poems (City Lights Pocket Series, 1959)
- Letters 1953-56 (reprint: Flood Editions, Chicago, 2003)
- The Opening of the Field (Grove Press, 1960/New Directions), PS3507.U629 O6
- Roots and Branches (Scribner's, 1964/New Directions)
- Medea at Kolchis; the maiden head (Berkeley: Oyez, 1965), PS3507.U629 M4
- Of the war: passages 22–27 (Berkeley: Oyez, 1966), PS3507.U629 O42
- Bending the Bow (New Directions, 1968)
- The Years As Catches: First poems (1939–1946) (Berkeley, CA: Oyez, 1966)
- Play time, pseudo stein (S.n. Tenth Muse, 1969), Case / PS3507.U629 P55
- Caesar's gate: poems 1949-50 with paste-ups by Jess (s.l. Sand Dollar, 1972), PS3507.U629 C3
- Selected poems by Robert Duncan (San Francisco, City Lights Books. Millwood, NY: Kraus Reprint Co., 1973, 1959), PN6101 .P462 v.2 no.8-14, Suppl.
- An ode and Arcadia (Berkeley: Ark P, 1974) PS3507.U629 O3
- Medieval scenes 1950 and 1959 ( Kent, Ohio: The Kent SU Libraries, 1978), Case / PS3507.U629 M43
- The five songs (Glendale, CA: Reagh, 1981) Case / PS3507 .U629 F5
- Fictive Certainties (Essays) (NY:New Directions, 1983)
- Ground Work: Before the War (NY: New Directions, 1984), PS3507 .U629 G7
- Ground Work II: In the Dark (NY: New Directions, 1987), PS3507 .U629 G69
- Selected Poems edited by Robert Bertholf (NY: New Directions, 1993)
- A Selected Prose (NY: New Directions, 1995)
- Copy Book Entries, transcribed by Robert J. Bertholf (Buffalo, NY: Meow Press, 1996)
- The Letters of Robert Duncan and Denise Levertov (Robert J. Bertholf and Albert Gelpi, eds) (Stanford, CA: Stanford University Press, 2004)
- Ground Work: Before the War / In the Dark, Introduction by Michael Palmer (NY:New Directions, 2006)
- The H.D. Book (The Collected Writings of Robert Duncan), edited by Michael Boughn and Victor Coleman (University of California Press, 2011). ISBN 978-0-520-26075-7
- The Unruly Garden: Robert Duncan and Eric Mottram, Letters and Essays, edited and with a Critical Introduction by Amy Evans and Shamoon Zamir (Peter Lang, 2007)
- A Poet's Mind: Collected Interviews with Robert Duncan,1960-1985, edited by Christopher Wagstaff and Gerrit Lansing (North Atlantic Books, 2012)

== Books about Robert Duncan ==
- Faas, Ekbert (1984) Young Robert Duncan: Portrait of the Poet and Homosexual in Society. Black Sparrow Press.
- Jarnot, Lisa (2012). Robert Duncan: The Ambassador from Venus. Berkeley: University of California Press. ISBN 978-0-520-23416-1.
