= Often I Am Permitted to Return to a Meadow =

1960 poem written by Robert Duncan

"Often I Am Permitted to Return to a Meadow" is a poem written by Robert Duncan in 1960. The poem was published in his book The Opening of the Field.

The speaker describes a meadow to which he is "often permitted to return." This meadow seems to represent a place that is metaphysically, spiritually, and emotionally valuable for him. The notion of permission is ambiguous: it is not made clear who does the permitting or why permission is needed.
