= Morton N. Cohen Award =

Biennial prize given by the Modern Language Association

The Morton N. Cohen Award for a Distinguished Edition of Letters is a biennial prize given to an editor by the Modern Language Association.

== Description ==
The award was established in 1989 by a gift from Morton N. Cohen, Professor Emeritus of English at the City University of New York. The award is presented each odd-numbered year.

The 2017 prize will be awarded for a book published in 2015 or 2016.

== Notable winners ==
Past winners of the prize include:

2011–12: Roger Kuin, York University, for The Correspondence of Sir Philip Sidney

2009–10: Martha Dow Fehsenfeld, Emory University; Lois More Overbeck, Emory University; George Craig, University of Sussex; and Dan Gunn, American University of Paris; for The Letters of Samuel Beckett, Volume 1: 1929–1940

2007–08: William G. Holzberger, Bucknell University, for The Letters of George Santayana, Book Seven, 1941–1947 and Book Eight, 1948–1952

2005–06: John Kelly, Oxford University, and Ronald Schuchard, Emory University, for The Collected Letters of W. B. Yeats, Volume 4

2003–04: Robert J. Bertholf, State University of New York, Buffalo, and Albert Gelpi, Stanford University, for The Letters of Robert Duncan and Denise Levertov
