= Stephen Bernard =

English academic and writer

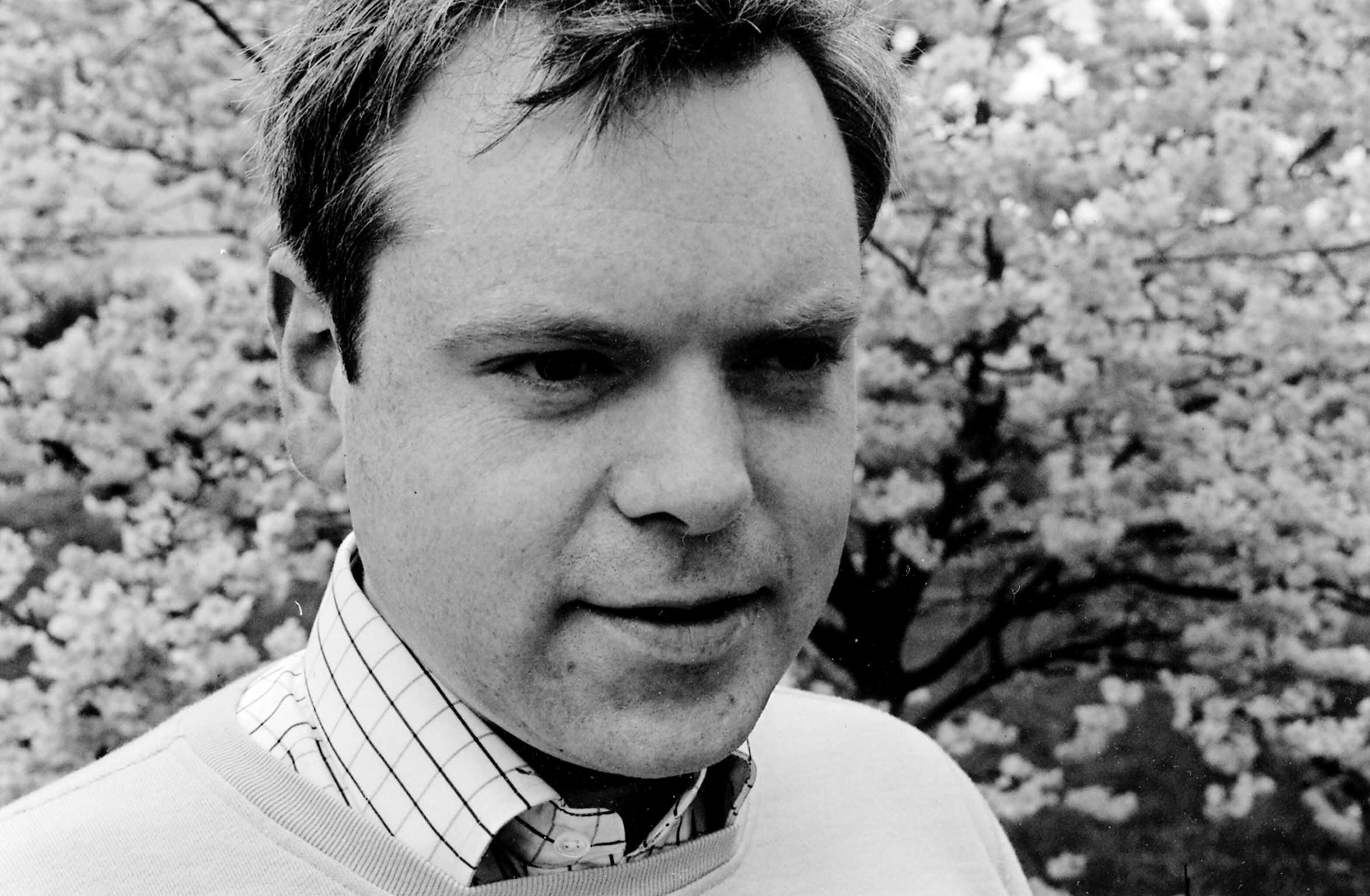
Stephen Bernard on the Isis, Oxford - 1995

Stephen Jarrod Bernard FSA FRSA FRHistS FHEA (born 1975) is an Academic Visitor at the Faculty of English Language and Literature, University of Oxford and a member of University College. A prize-winning essayist, editor, and bibliographer, he is known mostly for his bibliographical and book historical work on the Tonson publishing house which asked: "Who invented English literature, that is, as a conceptual category defined by canon and tradition? ... As good a claimant as any is the London bookseller Jacob Tonson."

His memoir about the sustained serial, clerical childhood sexual abuse in the Roman Catholic Diocese of Arundel and Brighton in the 1980s and 90s, his consequent mental illness, and the pioneering experimental psychiatric ketamine treatment he has received was a book of the year in the New Statesman and Evening Standard.

In 2019 Bernard was a core participant in the statutory Independent Inquiry into Child Sexual Abuse. On 2 March 2026 Alison Levitt, Baroness Levitt, the Under-Secretary of State for Justice, laid an amendment to the Crime and Policing Act 2026 to abolish time limitations in historical cases of child sexual abuse, thanking Bernard for "having played a big part in ensuring the government reached this decision" to implement recommendation 15 of the Inquiry's final report, after her having met with Jan Royall, Baroness Royall, and Bernard earlier in the passage of the Bill. This is the first and (as of June 2026) the only of the twenty recommendations in the Inquiry's final report to have been implemented in full.

== Career and education ==
He studied English literature at Christ Church, Oxford, and Brasenose College, Oxford, where he won the Gibbs Prize for English. In 2007, he won the Review of English Studies essay prize for his first article in an academic journal. In 2012, he won a British Academy Postdoctoral Research Fellowship, which he held in conjunction with a Junior Research Fellowship at University College, Oxford; whilst there he wrote The Literary Correspondences of the Tonsons (Oxford: Oxford University Press, 2015), an edition based on his doctoral thesis, for which he won the international biennial MLA Morton N. Cohen Award for a Distinguished Edition of Letters (2015–17). He was general editor, textual editor, and editor of English and Latin poems of The Plays and Poems of Nicholas Rowe, five vols. (London: Pickering Masters, 2017).

In 2018, he published Paper Cuts, a memoir (London: Jonathan Cape, 2018), which revealed that he had been the victim of sustained serial, clerical sexual abuse as a child, which had caused him severe mental illness which was treated with experimental ketamine infusions. After a campaign by Bernard's abuser's last surviving relative, Deidre McCormack, Canon Dermod Fogarty's headstone and memorial were destroyed with the consent of the Roman Catholic Diocese of Arundel and Brighton on 24 May 2018. The destruction of the headstone and memorial was recorded and can be seen on the BBC news website. The Catholic Herald published an editorial on Bernard's treatment by that Diocese and its wider implications for the Roman Catholic Church in England's response to clerical child sexual abuse as a result of this damnatio memoriae and his memoir.

Bernard specialises in the History of the Book and was awarded research fellowships at the William Andrews Clarke Memorial Library, UCLA, the Folger Shakespeare Library, Washington DC, and the Katharine F. Pantzer Research Fellowship by The Bibliographical Society. His research focusses on English literature of the long eighteenth century, particularly manuscript letters. He also works on legal and financial records concerning booksellers, including, for example, The Letters of Jacob Tonson in Bodleian MS. Eng. lett., c129 (Oxford Bibliographical Society, 2019 [2020]) and ‘The Tonson publishing house and the 18th century book trade’ (The Book Collector, 2020). Turning more fully to writers and the creation rather than production of literature, he has comprehensively edited The correspondence of John Dryden, with the assistance of John McTague (Manchester: Manchester University Press, 2022), which had not been included in the definitive Works of John Dryden, 20 vols (Berkeley: University of California Press, 1956-2002).

== Personal life ==
Bernard was diagnosed with mental illness as a result of his childhood experiences, recounted in his memoir. He lives in Oxford.
