= Hilda Stewart Reid =

English novelist and historian (1898–1982)

Hilda Reid in 1928

Hilda Stewart Reid (30 November 1898 – 24 April 1982) was an English novelist and historian. Her four novels, published between 1928 and 1939, are Phillida, Two Soldiers and a Lady, Emily, and Ashley Hamel.

== Early life ==
Hilda Reid was the daughter of Sir Arthur Hay Stewart Reid, a judge in the Indian legal service, whose family had served in India for several generations. Sir Arthur and his father, Henry Stewart Reid of the Bengal Civil Service, were both born in India. Hilda Reid's mother, Agnes Imogen Beadon, was the sixteenth child of Sir Cecil Beadon, who was Lieutenant Governor of Bengal from 1862 to 1866. Hilda Reid was born in Lahore, then in India now in Pakistan. Her early childhood was spent in Lahore; she moved to England at the age of nine, where she was cared for by her mother's sister Irene.

== Education ==
Hilda Reid took her undergraduate degree at Somerville College, Oxford, where she was a member of a close-knit group of friends, several of whom went on to have distinguished literary careers. The group included Winifred Holtby, Margaret Kennedy, Vera Brittain, and Sylvia Thompson. Hilda Reid remained particularly close, personally and professionally, to both Holtby and Brittain. In her autobiography Testament of Youth Brittain describes how Holtby introduced her to "her friend Hilda Reid, the pale, whimiscal second-year student who has since become, as H. S. Reid, the author of exquisite historical novels, delicately etched with the fine pen of a literary drypoint artist".

In the summer vacation during the First World War, Reid, like other students, undertook agricultural war work. She picked strawberries, which she described as "an agony of bending" and "pulled up flax with your bare hands. The Government did supply strong leather gloves, but they were in ribbons after the first 3 days. The flax was needed for making the fabric required for the cockpits and wings of aircraft."

An article in Time and Tide, describing leading women writers who had emerged from Oxford after the First World War, described Hilda Reid as a Somervillian who

was thought much of as a poet by her college, a gentle, dreamy, delicate creature, with fair fluffy hair that would not keep tidy, and a reputation for brilliant and fastidious scholarship that won prizes but could not win alphas in examinations. She forgot lectures, roamed mildly between the Bodleian and Somerville, scattering books; and went down with a fourth in History. But this year when she published Phillida, an exquisite study of the seventeenth century – gay with polished wit and musical phrases, concrete and authentic and vividly imagined, those few who had read the uncommon promise of her frugal essays said, 'I told you so. We knew that Hilda Reid could write.'

== Novels ==
- Phillida (Chatto & Windus, 1928)
- Two Soldiers and a Lady (Constable & Co., 1932)
- Emily (Constable & Co., 1933)
- Ashley Hamel (Constable & Co., 1939)

== Selected reviews ==
Phillida (1928)

In her review in Time and Tide, Reid's friend and Somerville classmate Vera Brittain described Phillida as "a rare and lovely book." Of Reid, she wrote, "To the generation that went down from Oxford just seven years ago, Miss H. S. Reid was known as an ardent and fastidious historical scholar, blissfully indifferent to the anxieties and rivalries of an examination system which offers little scope to an imagination so fine and so constructive."

The novel takes place in the seventeenth century, and Reid described her historical research as "assiduous." Critics praised Phillida's historical accuracy and convincing evocation of the period setting. The Times called Reid "a contemporary of the seventeenth century and of the twentieth century at once, and it is to this perhaps that the reader's pleasure is largely due. She is at home in the seventeenth century, and takes it so much for granted that we are soon persuaded to do the same."

Several publications also commended the novel's strength as a debut. The Times called it "remarkable as much for its performance as for its promise," while The Sunday Times wrote that "Phillida is a first novel of exceptional merit, and it should not be missed."

Two Soldiers and a Lady (1932)

Reid's second novel, also historical, garnered further praise for her "graceful style and intimate knowledge of seventeenth-century England."

The reviewer for the Observer wrote: "Scene and costume are subordinated to character, for the interest one feels in Miss Reid's two soldiers and the lady whom they served is due to them individually and not their (Cromwellian) period." Country Life called Two Soldiers and a Lady "a rare book, rare in the historical knowledge and historical sense that informs it, and rare in the perception the reader gains from it." The New York Times praised Reid's "deliberate concentration on what might, at first sight, appear to be historically of least importance," through which she "succeeded in reproducing the spirit of the period."

Emily (1933)

In Emily, her third novel, Reid departed from her previous historical themes in favour of a modern setting. Praising the book in The Schoolmistress, Winifred Holtby wrote, "Her two earlier books [...] were subtle and scholarly stories of the period after the Civil Wars. But in Emily she looks at the modern world, which is giving so much trouble to statesmen at Geneva. She looks and she laughs."

Other critics also commented approvingly on Reid's evocation of contemporary life. The Daily Telegraph wrote that "Miss Reid must have been studying life in Bloomsbury, or Chelsea, or one of the more precious of our garden suburbs [...] The cranks, the nut-eaters, the uplifters, the earnest remakers of post-war Europe are paraded in company with the most comic little group of Balkan intriguers London has ever sheltered."

Time and Tide called Emily "utterly joyous, irresponsible and deliciously mad," while the The Times Literary Supplement descrbed ot as "a modern extravaganza, very wittily performed." The reviewer in John O'London's Weekly praised Reid specifically as "an authority on witchcraft and village drama."

Ashley Hamel (1939)

Reid returned to a historical setting with her fourth novel, which marked the changes, social, political, and ecclesiastical, in a Dorsetshire village from the 18th century to the present day.

Both The Sunday Times and The Times Literary Supplement praised Ashley Hamel as "shrewd." The Times admired Reid's lack of sentimentality, while the Manchester Guardian wrote that Reid was "particularly successful with her eccentrics."

== Other publications ==
- "Famous Landscape Architects: Capability Brown," in Landscape & Garden, spring 1937
- One Hundred Years in a Chelsea Parish (Christ Church, Chelsea, 1938)
- The Story of the County of London Branch (British Red Cross Society, 1948)

A reviewer of One Hundred Years in a Chelsea Parish wrote that it is "an admirably written book, a model of a little history," noting that "Miss Hilda Reid has had not only books and the parish records and magazines for her material but personal memories of parishioners going far back into the nineteenth century."

The review in the South London Observer of The Story of the County of London Branch praised Reid's "terse, economical and factual" recollections of "the nights of fire and explosion, particularly in south London" during the Blitz, which Reid had observed firsthand while working with the Civil Defence. The book carried a foreword by Clementine Churchill.

== Later life ==
During the Second World War, Reid worked as an air-raid warden in the London borough of Chelsea, where she lived at 46 Tedworth Square with her sister Lesley (who worked during the war at the secret cryptographic centre at Bletchley Park), and their mother, Agnes Imogen Reid.

After the war, Reid wrote several unpublished novels and plays, and was for many years secretary of the Chelsea Society. Her unpublished novels include Tolpuddle House, Leaving Briarly, Thel, Egypt End, and Egremont. Her unpublished plays include The Jest of Fame and The Burning Deck.

Hilda Reid never married. She was the great-aunt of author Anna Reid.
