= Winifred Holtby =

English novelist and journalist (1898–1935)

- Born: 23 June 1898; Rudston, East Riding of Yorkshire, England
- Died: 29 September 1935 (aged 37); London, England
- Education: Somerville College, University of Oxford
- Occupations: Journalist, novelist
- Writing career
- Notable work: South Riding (1936)

Winifred Holtby (23 June 1898 – 29 September 1935) was an English novelist and journalist, now best known for her novel South Riding, which was posthumously published in 1936.

== Biography ==
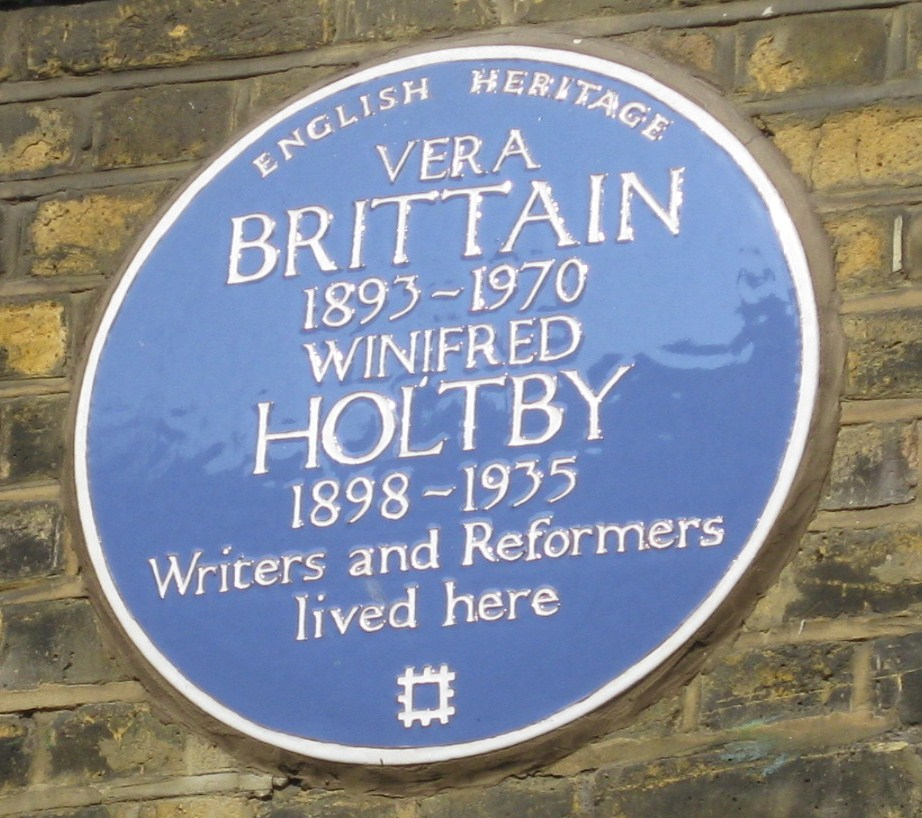
Plaque at 58 Doughty Street, London

Holtby was born to a prosperous farming family in the village of Rudston, East Riding of Yorkshire. Her father was David Holtby and her mother, Alice, was afterwards the first alderwoman on the East Riding County Council. Holtby was educated at home by a governess and then at Queen Margaret's School in Scarborough. Although she passed the entrance exam for Somerville College, Oxford, in 1917, she chose to join the Women's Army Auxiliary Corps (WAAC) in early 1918 but soon after she arrived in France, the First World War came to an end and she returned home. During this period, Holtby met Harry Pearson, the only man who stimulated romantic feelings in her, due primarily to his tales of the suffering soldiers endured during the war.

In 1919, she returned to study at the University of Oxford where she met Vera Brittain, a fellow student and later the author of Testament of Youth, with whom she maintained a lifelong friendship. Other literary contemporaries at Somerville College included Hilda Reid, Margaret Kennedy and Sylvia Thompson. After graduating from Oxford, in 1921, Winifred and Vera moved to London, hoping to establish themselves as writers (the blue plaque at No. 82 Doughty Street refers). They travelled to Germany in 1924, saying they wanted "to see for themselves the effect of the blockade, and the postwar miseries and humiliations".

Holtby was, together with Brittain, an ardent feminist, socialist and pacifist. She lectured extensively for the League of Nations Union and was a member of the feminist Six Point Group. She was active in the Independent Labour Party and was a staunch campaigner for the unionisation of black workers in South Africa, during which she had considerable contact with Leonard Woolf.

In a 1926 article, Holtby wrote:

Personally, I am a feminist … because I dislike everything that feminism implies. … I want to be about the work in which my real interests lie … But while … injustice is done and opportunity denied to the great majority of women, I shall have to be a feminist.

After Brittain's marriage in 1925 to George Catlin, Holtby shared her friend's homes in Nevern Place Earls Court and subsequently at 19 Glebe Place, Chelsea; Catlin resented the arrangement and his wife's close friendship with Holtby, who nevertheless became an adoptive aunt to Brittain's two children, John and Shirley (Baroness Williams of Crosby). Shirley describes her as being "tall – nearly 6ft – and slim, she was incandescent with the radiance of her short and concentrated life".

Holtby began to suffer from high blood pressure, recurrent headaches and bouts of lassitude, and in 1931 she was diagnosed as suffering from Bright's disease. Her doctor gave her only two years to live. Aware of her impending death, Holtby put all her remaining energy into what became her most important book, South Riding. Winifred Holtby died on 29 September 1935, aged 37. She never married, though Harry Pearson proposed to her on her deathbed, possibly at the instigation of Vera Brittain.

== Writings ==
Holtby's early novels – Anderby Wold (1923), The Crowded Street (1924) (re-published by Persephone Books in 2008, having been broadcast the previous year as a ten-part BBC Radio 4 dramatisation by Diana Griffiths) and The Land of Green Ginger (1927) – met with moderate success.

Holtby's fame was derived mainly from her journalism: she wrote for more than 20 newspapers and magazines, including the feminist journal Time and Tide (also serving on the board of directors) and the Manchester Guardian newspaper. She also wrote a regular weekly column for the trade union magazine The Schoolmistress. Her books during this period included two novels, Poor Caroline (1931), Mandoa, Mandoa! (1933), a critical study of Virginia Woolf (1932) and a volume of short stories, Truth is Not Sober (1934).

As well as her journalism, Holtby wrote 14 books, including six novels; two volumes of short stories; the first critical study of Virginia Woolf (1932) and Women and a changing civilization (1934), a feminist survey with opinions that are still relevant. She dedicated the latter book to composer Dame Ethel Smyth and actress and writer Cicely Hamiltion, both strong suffragists who "did more than write "The March of the Women", the song composed in 1910 for the Women's Social and Political Union. She also wrote poetry, including poems about Vera Brittain's dead brother, Edward.

In Women and a changing civilisation Holtby linked the 1930s reaction against feminism to a broader "revolt against reason which has affected the intellectual life of the entire Western World". Holtby contextualized the rise of the Nazis, and the Western turn to the political Right in general, as a reaction to the broader upheavals of war and depression: "Just after the [First World] war, society was infected by a rush of idealism to the head. Democracy and reason, equality and co-operation were acclaimed as uncontested virtues. In the new constitutions of Europe and America were incorporated splendid statements about the freedom of opinion, equality of the sexes, accessibility of education. We were about to build a brave new world upon the ruins of catastrophe ... About 1926, after the General Strike in England and its failure, after the entry of Germany into the League of Nations and the delay by the Powers in making good their promises, the slump in idealism began to set in. Reason, democracy, the effort of the individual human will, liberty and equality were at a discount." Holtby noted that a former politician had explained the apathy of young women with reference to their experience of "huge impersonal events – the War, the Boom, the Slump. News is reported daily of immense catastrophes over which they can have no control, the Japanese and Indian earthquakes, Chinese famine, African drought ... The individual will seems unimportant, the individual personality is dwarfed, by happenings on so large a scale ... This is the slump complex – this narrowing of ambition, this closing-in alike of ideas and opportunities. Somewhere, a spring of vitality and hope has failed."

Holtby perceived feminism as necessarily tied to Enlightenment rationality, progress, and social engineering: "The attempt to create communities where men and women alike share the full stature of humanity is an attempt to do something which has not been done before, and which can only be achieved under certain conditions. And one of these is the acceptance of reason as a guide in human conduct. If we choose an anti-rational philosophy, in this quest, at least, we are defeated. The enemies of reason are inevitably the opponents of 'equal rights.'"

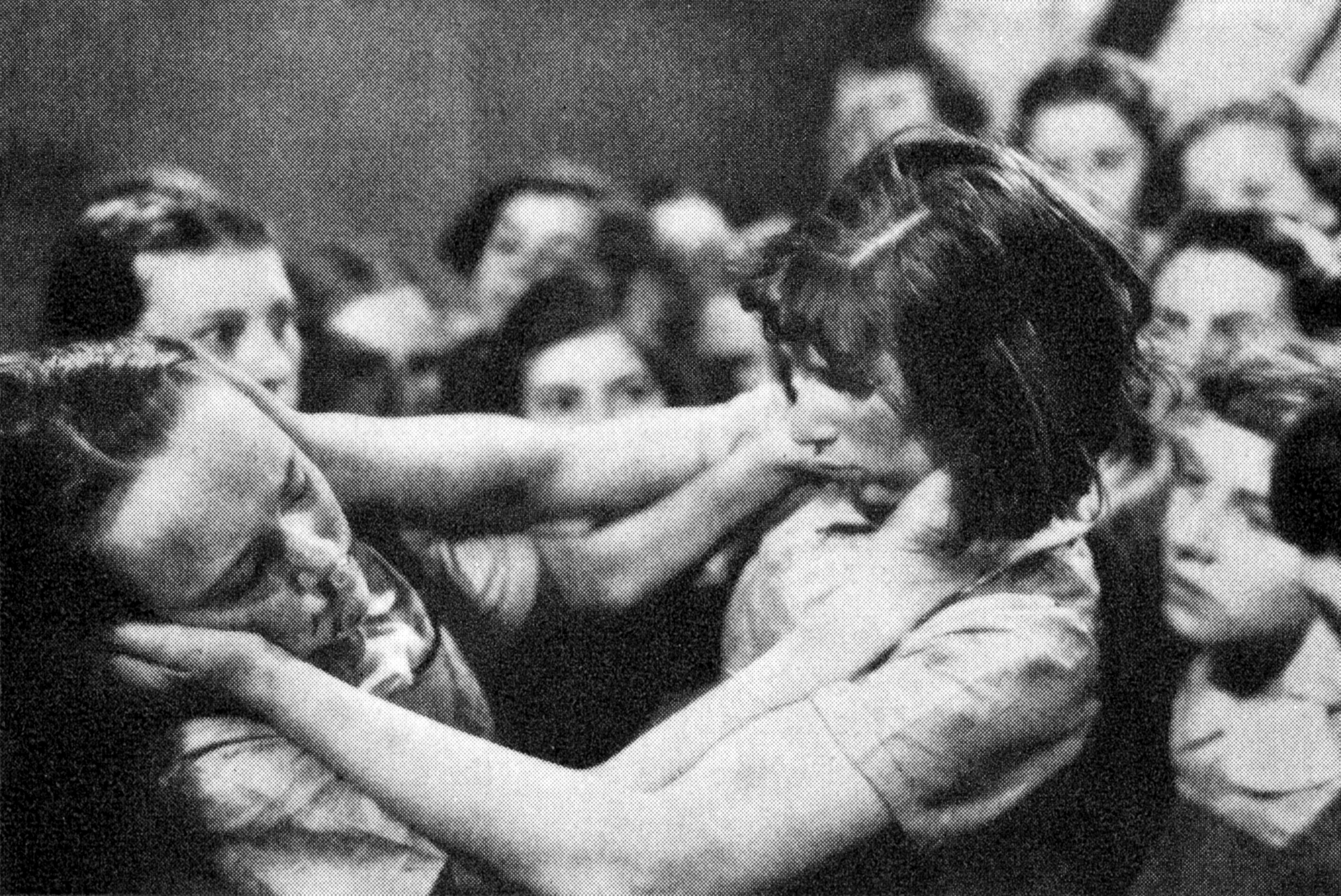
Glynis Johns (left) and Joan Ellum in the film South Riding (1938), produced by Alexander Korda and directed by Victor Saville

Holtby is best remembered for her novel South Riding, edited by Vera Brittain and published posthumously in March 1936, which received high praise from the critics. The book won the James Tait Black Memorial Prize for 1936 and has never been out of print. The Feminist Companion to Literature in English claims that, like all Holtby's other novels, it is "staunchly feminist in its use of a strong woman as the central protagonist." In 1938, it was made into a film directed by Victor Saville; in 1974 it was adapted by Stan Barstow for Yorkshire Television and in 2011, BBC One produced a three-part dramatisation by Andrew Davies. There have also been several radio adaptations, the most recent for BBC Radio Four in 2005.

Vera Brittain wrote about her friendship with Holtby in her book Testament of Friendship (1940) and in 1960 published a censored edition of their correspondence. Their letters, along with many of Holtby's other papers, were donated in 1960 to Hull Central Library in Yorkshire and are now held at the Hull History Centre. Other papers are in Bridlington library in Yorkshire, in McMaster University Library in Canada and in the University of Cape Town library in South Africa. A biography of Holtby by Marion Shaw, The Clear Stream, was published in 1999 and draws on a broad range of sources.

Holtby was buried in All Saints' churchyard in Rudston, East Yorkshire, just yards from the house in which she was born. Her epitaph is "God give me work till my life shall end and life till my work is done".

All her novels, together with a collection of short stories and a collection of her journalism, were reprinted by Virago in the Virago Modern Classics series in the 1980s.

== Tributes ==
In 1967, the Royal Society of Literature instituted the Winifred Holtby Memorial Prize for the best regional novel of the year. In 2003 the award was incorporated into the Ondaatje Prize.

On her death, Holtby left a small legacy and her own collection of books to a library in the South African township of Soweto, which was opened in December 1940. It was named the Winifred Holtby Memorial Library. It was the first library to be built in Africa specifically for non-Europeans.

== Publications ==
=== Novels ===
- Anderby Wold (1923)
- The Crowded Street (1924)
- The Land of Green Ginger (1927)
- Poor Caroline (1931)
- Mandoa, Mandoa! (1933)
- The Astonishing Island (1933)
- South Riding (1936; published posthumously)

=== Poetry ===
- My Garden (1911)
- The Frozen Earth (1935)

=== Other fiction ===
- Truth is Not Sober and Other Stories (1934), collection of short stories
- Take Back Your Freedom (1939; published posthumously), play
- Remember Remember (1999; published posthumously), collection of short stories

=== Non-fiction ===
- A New Voter's Guide to Party Programmes (1929)
- Virginia Woolf: a Critical Memoir (1932)
- Women and a changing civilisation (1934)
- Letters to a Friend (1937; published posthumously)

== See also ==
- Winifred Holtby Academy
- List of Winifred Holtby Memorial Prize award winners
