= South Riding (novel) =

1936 novel by Winifred Holtby

First edition (publ. Collins)

South Riding is a novel by Winifred Holtby, published posthumously in 1936.

The book is set in the fictional South Riding of Yorkshire: the inspiration being the East Riding rather than the modern South Yorkshire; Holtby's mother, Alice, was the first alderwoman on the East Riding County Council. The leading characters are Sarah Burton, an idealistic young headmistress; Robert Carne of Maythorpe Hall, tormented by his disastrous marriage; Joe Astell, a socialist fighting poverty; and Mrs Beddows, the first woman alderman of the district.

The book won the James Tait Black Memorial Prize for 1936. The rights to the book were given to Somerville College, Oxford by Holtby on her death, which used royalties from South Riding and Pavements at Anderby to fund a scholarship.

== Adaptations ==
- The novel was adapted for the cinema in 1938 starring Edna Best as Sarah Burton, Ralph Richardson as Robert Carne and Edmund Gwenn as Alfred Huggins.
- It was adapted for television by Stan Barstow for Yorkshire Television in 1974, starring Hermione Baddeley as Mrs Beddows, Dorothy Tutin as Sarah Burton, Nigel Davenport as Robert Carne and Judi Bowker as Midge Carne.
  - The series won both the BAFTA and the Broadcasting Press Guild awards for Best Drama Series in 1975.
- A radio version starring Sarah Lancashire and Philip Glenister was broadcast on BBC Radio 4 in 1999.
- A BBC television adaptation by Andrew Davies, starring Anna Maxwell Martin and David Morrissey, was produced in 2010 and broadcast in February 2011.
