= Sylvia Thompson =

English novelist (1902–1968)

- Born: 4 September 1902; Scotland
- Died: 27 April 1968 (aged 65); Reigate Heath, Surrey, England
- Occupation: Writer (novelist)
- Spouse: Peter Luling (m. 1926)
- Children: Rosemary Haughton, Virginia Lulin, Elizabeth Dooley
- Writing career
- Period: 20th century
- Genre: Fiction

Sylvia Thompson, Mrs Luling (4 September 1902 – 27 April 1968) was an English novelist, writer and public speaker born in 1902, Scotland.

== Life ==
Sylvia Thompson was born in Scotland, the daughter of Norman Arthur Thompson (founder of the Norman Thompson Flight Company) and Ethel Hannah Levis.

She attended Somerville College, Oxford like her mother. Other literary contemporaries at Somerville College included Vera Brittain, Winifred Holtby, Hilda Reid and Margaret Kennedy. She established her reputation as a public orator, and in 1932, she joined the lecture circuit in the United States.

== Personal life ==
In 1926, she married Theodore Peter Dunham Luling (an artist known as "Peter Luling"), with whom she had three daughters: Rosemary Haughton (theologian and writer), Virginia Luling (anthropologist) and Elizabeth Dooley (actress).

== Death ==
Sylvia Thompson Luling died on 27 April 1968, aged 65, at Reigate Heath, Surrey, England.

== Works ==
- The Rough Crossing (1921)
- A Lady in Green Gloves (1924)
- The Hounds of Spring (1926)
- The Battle of the Horizons (1928)
- Chariot Wheels (1929)
- Winter Comedy (in the USA Portrait by Caroline) (1931)
- Summer's Night (1932)
- Helena (in the USA Unfinished Symphony) (1933)
- Breakfast in Bed (1934)
- A Silver Rattle (1935)
- Third Act in Venice (1936)
- Recapture the Moon (1937)
- The Adventure of Christopher Columin (1939)
- The Gulls Fly Inland (1941)
- The People Opposite (1948)
- The Candle's Glory (1953)
