= Victoria Lautman =

American journalist and writer

- Education: George Washington University University of New Mexico Merton College at Oxford University
- Occupation(s): Journalist, writer, and lecturer

Victoria Lautman is an American journalist, writer, and lecturer. Her work focuses on Indian art and culture.

== Education ==
Lautman received a master's degree in Art History from George Washington University and a bachelor's degree in Anthropology and Art History from the University of New Mexico. She attended Merton College at Oxford University for archaeological field training.

== Career ==
Following graduate school, Lautman was employed by the Smithsonian Institution's Hirshhorn Museum and Sculpture Garden. Lautman started her career as a weekly arts reviewer in 1984 on WBEZ, a National Public Radio outlet in Chicago. During the next two decades, she founded and published a long-running arts and culture magazine, Artistic License, and then went on to be an interviewer and contributor to the station. In 2004, she moved to WFMT radio and created the Chicago author-interview series, Writers on the Record with Victoria Lautman, with authors. Lautman's interviews with Jonathan Lethem, Lady Antonia Fraser, Amitav Ghosh, and others have also been heard at the Chicago Humanities Festival.

As a print journalist, Lautman has written for a wide array of publications and was formerly the Chicago editor for the magazines Metropolitan Home, Art+Auction, Architectural Record, and House & Garden.

== Books ==
Lautman produced the collection of research culminated in the release of The Vanishing Stepwells of India (with Divay Gupta) by Merrell Publishers in 2017.

Subsequent exhibitions of her stepwell photographs were mounted at the Fowler Museum at UCLA in 2019 and at the RMIT University Gallery in Melbourne in 2018. Lautman has lectured widely on the topic throughout the United States and India.

Lautman's earlier non-fiction book, The New Tattoo, was published by Abbeville Press in 1994 and included photography by Vicki Berndt.
