= South Riding (2011 TV series) =

- Genre: Period drama
- Based on: South Riding by Winifred Holtby
- Written by: Andrew Davies
- Directed by: Diarmuid Lawrence
- Starring: Anna Maxwell Martin; David Morrissey
- Country of origin: United Kingdom
- Original language: English
- No. of series: 1
- No. of episodes: 3

Production
- Producer: Lisa Osborne
- Cinematography: Alan Arnold
- Running time: 60 minutes
- Production company: BBC Drama

Original release
- Network: BBC One
- Release: 20 February – 6 March 2011

South Riding was a BBC serial in three parts from 2011, based on the 1936 novel South Riding by Winifred Holtby. It was directed by Diarmuid Lawrence and written by Andrew Davies. It starred Anna Maxwell Martin, David Morrissey, Peter Firth, Douglas Henshall, Penelope Wilton and John Henshaw.

The first episode aired on BBC One 20 February 2011, the two remaining on the following Sundays. In the United States, it aired on the PBS anthology series Masterpiece in May 2011.

== Cast ==
- Anna Maxwell Martin as Sarah Burton
- David Morrissey as Robert Carne
- Peter Firth as Alderman Snaith
- Douglas Henshall as Joe Astell
- Penelope Wilton as Mrs. Beddows
- John Henshaw as Alfred Huggins
- Shaun Dooley as Mr. Holly
- Jennifer Hennessy as Mrs. Holly
- Janine Mellor as Bessy Warbuckle
- Charlie May Clark as Lydia Holly
- Katherine McGolpin as Midge Carne
- Lydia Wilson as Muriel Carne
- Daniel West as Young Robert Carne
- Ian Bartholomew as Gaius Drew
- Bríd Brennan as Miss Sigglesthwaite
- John-Paul Hurley as Reg Aythorne
- Penny Layden as Mrs Huggins
- Marie Critchley as Mrs Brimsley
