= Albert Gelpi =

Albert Gelpi is the Coe Professor of American Literature Emeritus at Stanford University. He taught literature, particularly poetry, there between 1968 and 2002.

Gelpi also wrote a trilogy of literary criticism involving American poetry:

- The Tenth Muse: The Psyche of the American Poet
- A Coherent Splendor: The American Poetic Renaissance, 1910–1950
- American Poetry after Modernism: The Power of the Word

Gelpi was awarded a Guggenheim Fellowship in 1977 for his work in American literature. He received the Dean's Award for Distinguished Teaching at Stanford University in 1996. His books are held in libraries worldwide. He earned degrees from Loyola University New Orleans (BA), Tulane University (MA), and Harvard University (PhD).
