= 1861 in literature =

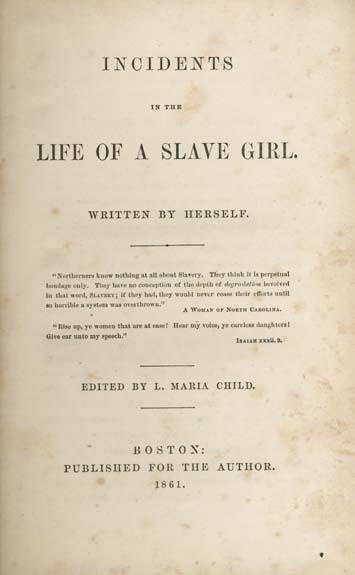
Frontispiece for Incidents in the Life of a Slave Girl. Written by Herself. Published in 1861.

This article contains information about the literary events and publications of 1861.

== Events ==
- January 5 – The first issue of the Weekly Budget magazine is published by James Henderson.
- January 11 – Thirty-one-year-old John Edward Taylor the younger becomes sole editor and proprietor of the Manchester Guardian.
- March – Fyodor Dostoyevsky's monthly Vremya (Вре́мя, Time) begins publication in Saint Petersburg under the nominal editorship of his brother Mikhail. Fyodor's novel The House of the Dead (Записки из Мёртвого дома, Zapiski iz Myortvogo doma) is first published in it this year.
- April 23 – Herbert Coleridge, first editor of what will become the Oxford English Dictionary, dies aged 30 of tuberculosis in London. Frederick James Furnivall is appointed to succeed him.
- May/July – The Bombay Times and Journal of Commerce becomes The Times of India.
- June 29 – Elizabeth Barrett Browning dies aged 55 in the arms of her husband and fellow poet Robert Browning in Florence; on July 1 she is buried in the Protestant cemetery there. Robert leaves the city soon afterwards.
- July – Sheridan Le Fanu becomes editor and proprietor of the Dublin University Magazine. From October he begins in it the serialization of his novel The House by the Churchyard.
- July 19–24 – Rev. James Long is tried in Calcutta for defamation in distributing a translation of Dinabandhu Mitra's play Nil Darpan.
- August 3 – Serialization of Charles Dickens's Bildungsroman Great Expectations in his magazine All the Year Round is concluded; in October it is published complete in three volumes by Chapman & Hall in London.
- September 14 – Gottfried Keller becomes municipal secretary of his home town of Zürich.
- September 19 – Mrs. Henry Wood's 'sensation novel' East Lynne is published in London in three volumes, as its serialisation is concluded in The New Monthly Magazine. This year also sees its first theatrical adaptation, as Edith, or The Earl's Daughter, staged in New York City.
- October 20 – Poet and dramatist Apollo Korzeniowski is arrested for his political activities and placed in the infamous Tenth Pavilion of Warsaw Citadel.
- unknown date – The first modern New Zealand novel, Henry Butler Stoney's Taranaki: A Tale of the War, is published.

== New books ==
=== Fiction ===
- William Harrison Ainsworth – The Constable of the Tower
- Mary Elizabeth Braddon
  - The Black Band
  - The Octoroon
  - "The Trail of the Serpent"
- Frances Browne – My Share of the World
- Charles Dickens – Great Expectations
- Fyodor Dostoevsky – Humiliated and Insulted (Униженные и оскорблённые, Unizhennye i oskorblyonye)
- George Eliot – Silas Marner
- Oliver Wendell Holmes Sr. – Elsie Venner (previously serialized beginning in 1859)
- Josip Jurčič – Pripovedka o beli kači (The Tale of the White Snake)
- Balduin Möllhausen – Die Halbindianer (The Halfbreeds)
- Charles Reade – The Cloister and the Hearth
- Seeley Regester (Metta Victoria Fuller Victor) – Maum Guinea, and Her Plantation "Children", or, Holiday-week on a Louisiana Estate: a Slave Romance
- George Sand – Consuelo
- Walter Chalmers Smith – The Bishop's Walk
- William Makepeace Thackeray – The Adventures of Philip
- Anthony Trollope
  - Framley Parsonage (book form)
  - Orley Farm (publication begins)
- George J. Whyte-Melville – Market Harborough
- Mrs Henry Wood – East Lynne
- Charlotte M. Yonge – The Young Step-Mother

=== Children ===
- R. M. Ballantyne – The Gorilla Hunters
- Mary Louise Peebles (as Lynde Palmer) – The Little Captain

=== Drama ===
- Henry James Byron – Aladdin, or, The Wonderful Scamp
- Léon Gozlan – La Pluie et le beau temps (Rain and Fine Weather)
- Alexander Griboyedov (died 1829) – Woe from Wit (first full publication)
- Imre Madách – The Tragedy of Man (Az ember tragédiája)

=== Poetry ===
- Charles Baudelaire – Les Fleurs du mal, 2nd edition
- Michael Madhusudan Dutt – Meghnad Badh Kabya (মেঘনাদবধ কাব্য, Slaying of Meghnad)
- Hymns Ancient and Modern
- Friedrich Reinhold Kreutzwald – Kalevipoeg (Estonian national epic, publication begins)
- F. T. Palgrave – Golden Treasury of English Songs and Lyrics (anthology)

=== Non-fiction ===
- Isabella Beeton – Mrs Beeton's Book of Household Management
- Michael Faraday – The Chemical History of a Candle
- Harriet Jacobs (as Linda Brent) – Incidents in the Life of a Slave Girl
- Eliphas Lévi – La Clef des grands mystères (The Key to Great Mysteries)
- Karl Marx and Friedrich Engels – Writings on the U.S. Civil War
- Narmadashankar Dave – Narmakosh (vol. 1)
- Pierre-Joseph Proudhon – La Guerre et la paix (War and Peace)

== Births ==
- January 6 – János Zsupánek, Slovene-Hungarian author and poet (died 1951)
- January 23 – Katharine Tynan, Irish-born novelist, poet and writer (died 1931)
- February 5 – Lulah Ragsdale, American poet, novelist, and actor (died 1953)
- February 22 — Mabelle Biggart, American elocutionist and writer (unknown year of death)
- March 1 – Henry Harland, American novelist and editor (died 1905)
- March 10 – Pauline Johnson, Canadian poet (died 1913)
- April ? – Herminie Templeton Kavanagh, née McGibney, Anglo-Irish-American short story writer (died 1933)
- April 15 – Bliss Carman, Canadian-born poet (died 1929)
- May 5 – Sir John Edward Lloyd, Welsh historian (died 1947)
- May 7 – Rabindranath Tagore, Bengali poet and novelist (died 1941)
- May 13 – Margaret Marshall Saunders, Canadian author (died 1947)
- May 25 – Julia Boynton Green, American author and poet (died 1957)
- September 2 – Mircea Demetriade, Romanian poet and actor (died 1914)
- September 20 – Herbert Putnam, American Librarian of Congress (died 1955)
- October 16 – J. B. Bury, Irish historian (died 1927)
- November 8 – William Price Drury, English novelist, playwright and Royal Marines officer (died 1949)
- November 10 – Amy Levy, English novelist and essayist (died 1889)
- December 19 – Constance Garnett, née Black, English translator (died 1946)

== Deaths ==
- January 28 – Henri Murger, French novelist and poet (born 1808)
- January 29 – Catherine Gore, English novelist and dramatist (born 1798)
- February 20 – Eugène Scribe, French dramatist (born 1791)
- March 10 (February 26 O. S.) – Taras Shevchenko, Ukrainian poet and artist (born 1814)
- April 1 – Lady Charlotte Bury, English novelist and diarist (born 1755)
- April 28 – Frances Mary Richardson Currer, English heiress and bibliophile (born 1785)
- May 23 – Edward Cardwell, English theologian (born 1787)
- June 7 – Patrick Brontë, Irish-born writer and cleric (born 1777)
- June 29 – Elizabeth Barrett Browning, English poet (born 1806)
- July 6 – Sir Francis Palgrave, English historian (born 1788)
- November 8 or November 9 - Maria da Felicidade do Couto Browne, early Portuguese woman poet (born 1797)
- November 13 – Arthur Hugh Clough, English poet (malaria; born 1819)
- November 30
  - Alexander Gilchrist, English biographer (scarlet fever, born 1828)
  - Theodor Mundt, German novelist and critic (born 1808)
