= John Proctor (artist) =

British artist, cartoonist and illustrator

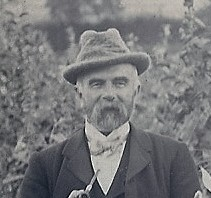
- Born: 26 May 1836; Edinburgh, Scotland
- Died: 10 August 1914 (aged 78); Little London, near Albury, Surrey, England
- Resting place: Nunhead Cemetery, Nunhead, South London, England
- Occupations: Cartoonist and illustrator
- Known for: Notable Victorian political cartoonist and book illustrator

John Proctor (26 May 1836 – 10 August 1914) was a British artist, cartoonist and illustrator, well known in his day for political cartoons in magazines such as Judy and Moonshine, rivals to Punch. He also illustrated many books and was one of Lewis Carroll's choices to illustrate Alice Through the Looking-Glass instead of John Tenniel.

== Personal life ==
John Proctor was born 26 May 1836 in St Cuthbert's, Edinburgh, he was the son of Adam Proctor (1797–1869) who was a plumber and his wife Eliza Proctor (1809–1897). He married Harriet Johanna McCallum (1836–1920) on 25 July 1861 in Town Yetholm, Roxburghshire, Scotland. They had nine children including Adam Edwin Proctor (1865–1913), a watercolour artist. They spent most of their married life in London, retiring to Little London, near Albury in Surrey, by 1911. He died at 'Heathend', Little London, on 10 August 1914 and is buried in Nunhead Cemetery, London.

== Career ==
Proctor was apprenticed to William Banks in Edinburgh for six years to master steel and copper engraving before moving to London around 1859. In his words, he was “… equipped with a limited art education but a fair share of ambition in my head and a book of character sketches of Lammas Fair in my wallet. The reason for my invasion was to get into black and white business straightaway”. In the 1861 UK Census, he is listed as an 'artist on wood'.

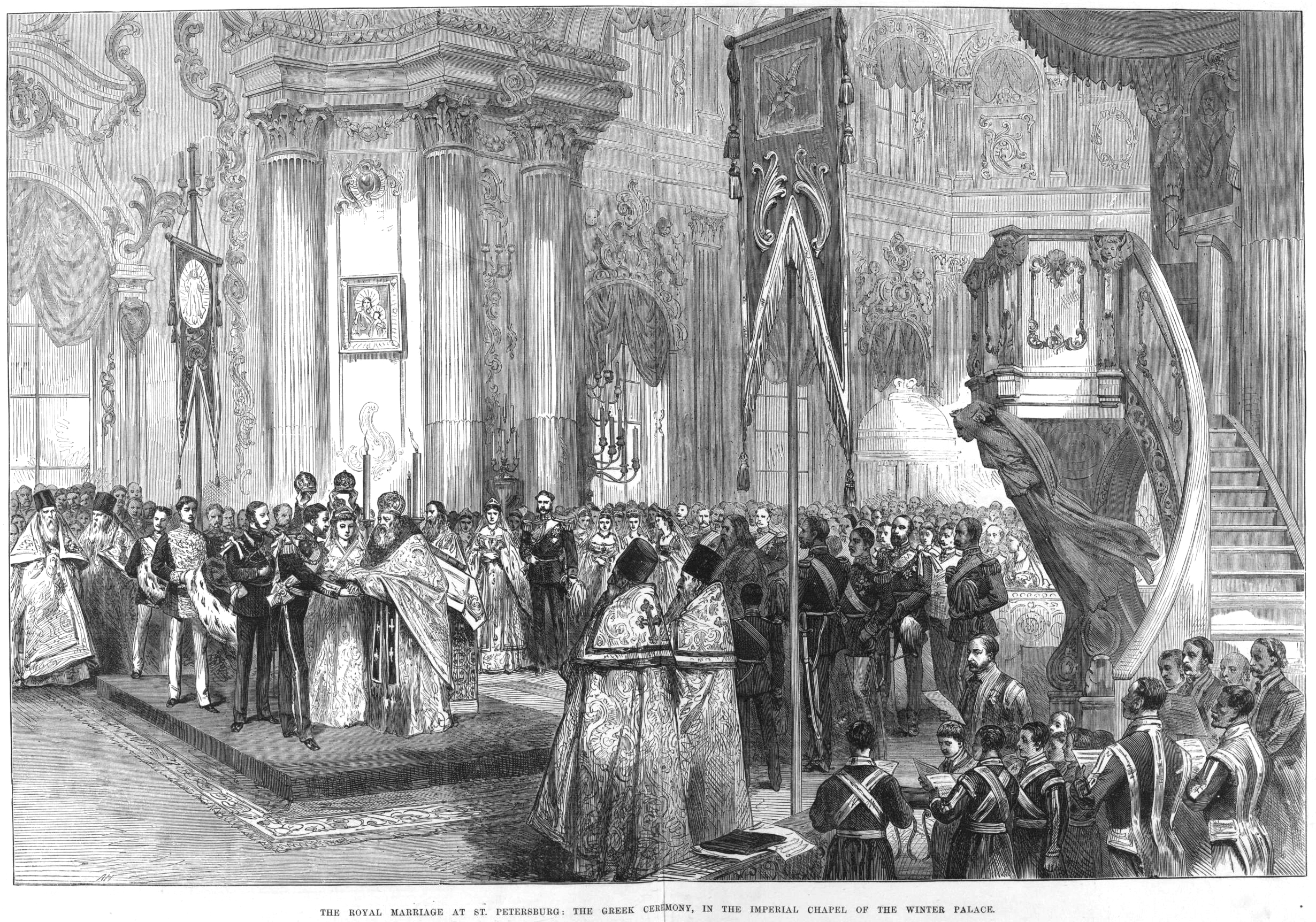
The Royal Marriage at St Petersburg, the Greek Ceremony, in the Imperial Chapel of the Winter Palace, Illustrated London News 1874

His career began as a graphic journalist for the Illustrated London News and was a special artist in St Petersburg, Russia in 1874 covering the royal wedding of Prince Alfred and Grand Duchess Maria Alexandrovna. He became the sole resident artist for Cassell, Petter and Galpin from 1861 to 1867 and contributed regularly to Cassell's Illustrated Family Paper and other magazines as well as illustrations for books such as Bright Thoughts for the Little Ones (1866).

With regular work assured at Cassell’s, Proctor was able to contribute to other publications such as George Stiff's, The London Journal and the Seven Days Journal (later The London Reader).

In the 1860s along with Charles Gibbon and a 'Mr Rankin' he purchased the weekly paper Empire but despite their enthusiasm it proved a failure.

From 1867 to 1868 Proctor drew the two-page centrefold cartoons in Judy; or, the London Serio-comic Journal. In 1868 he moved on to illustrate the centre pages of the weekly periodical Moonshine which he did until 1877. Proctor contributed illustrations for the jingoistic paper Sons of Britannia a precursor to the Boy's Own Paper. Some of Proctor's best work was done for James Henderson's periodicals such as Young Folks, Funny Folks which is considered to be one of the first British comics and Fun. He was also a regular contributor to Cassell’s Saturday Journal, Illustrated Bits, Sketch, and Will O’ the Wisp.

Among his most significant contributions to Young Folks in the 1870s were his illustrations under the pseudonym of 'Puck' for works by Roland Quiz (Richard Quittenton) and Walter Villiers (pen name of penny dreadful author Walter Viles). Quiz's Giant-land, the Wonderful Adventures of Tim Pippin, illustrated by Proctor, were later published in book form and was a significant late nineteenth century and remained in print until the 1940s.

In 1868 Lewis Carroll approached Proctor to illustrate Through the Looking-Glass, as John Tenniel was initially unavailable. Proctor responded saying he was too busy and ultimately Tenniel decided to do the illustrations.Proctor told his family the reason, in addition to his schedule, for his rejection of the project was Carroll’s reputation of being very difficult to work with.

Proctor was in high demand during the late nineteenth century, illustrating many books and at one point producing two to three major cartoons a week for periodicals. However he did find time to enjoy himself and was an enthusiastic member of the Whitefriars Club and the Savage Club, mixing with some of the most prominent artists, actors and other eminent members of Victorian society.
