= The London Journal =

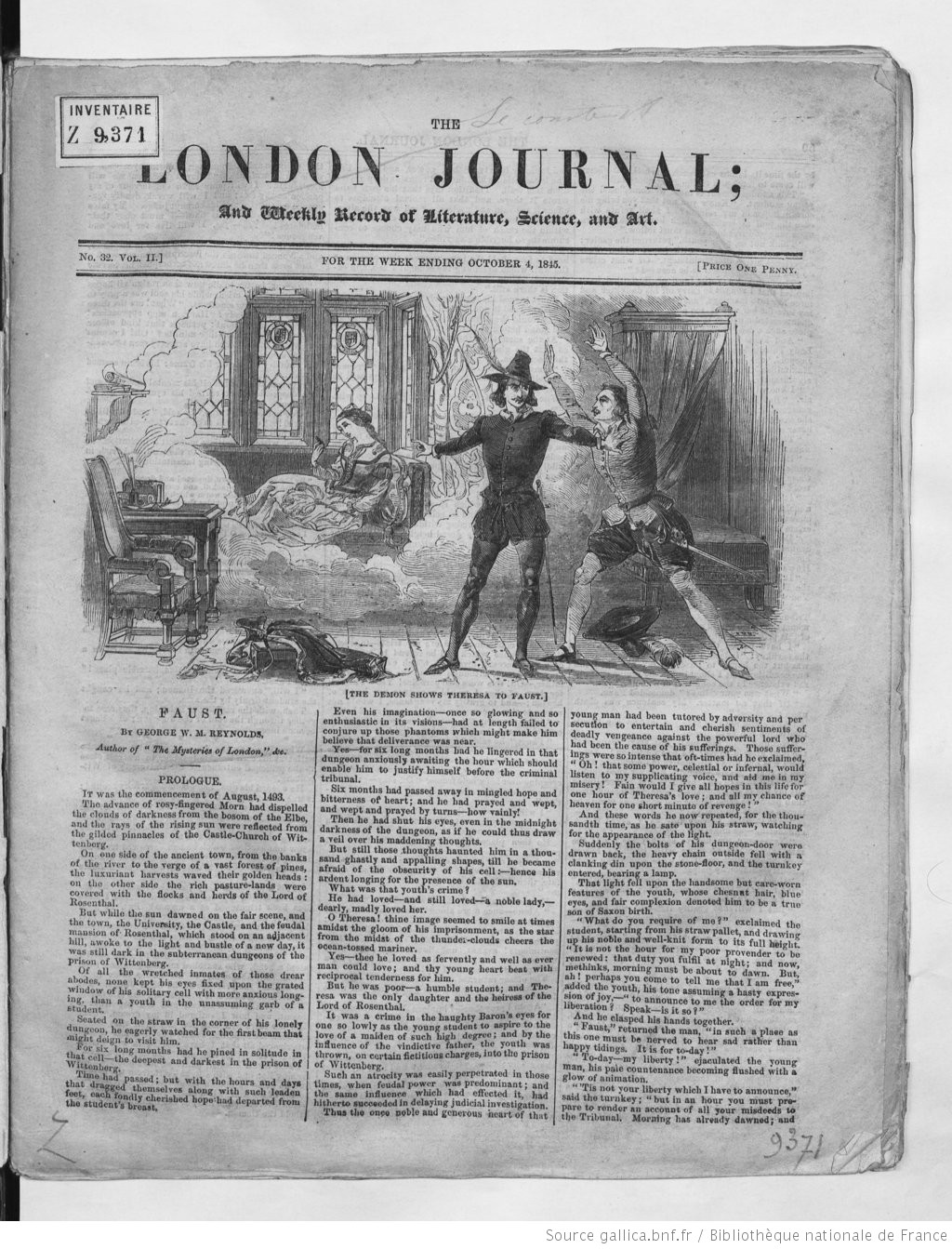
Front cover of The London Journal, 4 October 1845

The London Journal; and Weekly Record of Literature, Science and Art (published from 1845 to 1928) was a British penny fiction weekly, one of the best-selling magazines of the nineteenth century.

== History ==
The London Journal began as a British penny fiction weekly, one of the best-selling magazines of the nineteenth century. It was designed to appeal to a wide and newly literate audience in the mid-nineteenth century. The magazine’s mix of serialized fiction, illustrations, and household features made it one of the most successful and affordable family publications of its time.

The London Journal was established by George Stiff, a printer and publisher who aimed to produce an inexpensive illustrated periodical that would reach the growing market of working and middle-class readers. Stiff described the paper as a cross between The Illustrated London News and the Family Herald, combining popular fiction, moral instruction, and educational articles.It was published by George Vickers and initially written and edited by George W. M. Reynolds, who left in 1847 to start "Reynolds’s Miscellany" After his departure, John Wilson Ross assumed editorial duties, and the publication continued to grow in both size and readership. The London Journal featured serialized novels, short stories, and essays on literature, science, and art.

Herbert Ingram, in secret partnership with Punch's owners Bradbury and Evans, bought the magazine in 1857, and Punch's editor Mark Lemon was placed in editorial charge. Lemon's attempt to rebrand the magazine, serializing novels by Walter Scott, was a commercial failure. George Stiff bought back the paper in 1859 (combining it with a title, The Guide, which he had started in the interim) and installed Percy B. St. John and then Pierce Egan as editor. After Stiff's bankruptcy in 1862, W. S. Johnson became proprietor.

By 1883 it had transformed itself from being a 'penny family weekly' into what was recognizably a 'woman’s magazine'. Herbert Allingham became editor in 1889, publishing his own story "A Devil of a Woman" in 1893.

== Transition from Penny weekly to woman's magazine ==
When The London Journal originated in 1845 it started off as a penny weekly magazine targeting working and middle class families to entertain them. The London Journal published sensational novels like Lady Audley’s secret and Reuben Gray. Those novels were primarily meant to entertain working class readers which made the magazine very popular at the time, and as the magazine continued to progress it started to shift its content to target women. The magazine started to include advertisements and tips on self care which would be targeted towards women’s interests like how to take care of their nails. Historians who have analyzed The London Journal have also noted the shift in content and writing throughout the time The London Journal was in production. Initially The London Journal referred to women in the third person primarily targeting men as its primary audience. As the magazine developed, there was a shift not only in content but perspective on women as they started to be spoken to in the second person which showed that they were now starting to become a part of the target audience.

== Popularity of the Magazine Over Time ==
When The London Journal launched in 1845, it quickly became one of the most successful penny weeklies in Britain. A mix of serialized fiction, lessons, and illustrations provided affordable entertainment for working and middle class readers. During this early period, its accessible price of one penny per issue helped it gain popularity. By the mid 1850s, The London Journal reached the peak of its popularity, selling over 500,000 copies a week. This peak reflected both its appeal and the success of its serialized fiction, particularly "Minnigrey" by John Frederick Smith, which was one of the most popular novels of its time. Profits were estimated at around £10,000 to £12,000 annually.

After 1857, under new ownership by Herbert Ingram, they rebranded and tried to appeal to a higher class audience. This resulted in a major decline, as it failed to attract previous readers who originally loved The London Journal for its emotional storytelling. Even by the year 1859, the magazine never regained its earlier momentum. The magazine then shifted its focus again in the 1880’s targeting women as their target audience, but the magazine never regained the same popularity it had in the early to mid 1850’s.

== Contributors ==
Contributors to the magazine included leading authors of the day, such as Mary Elizabeth Braddon (Lady Audley's Secret and The Outcast), E. D. E. N. Southworth (The Gypsy’s Prophecy), and Pierce Egan (The Poor Girl). However, it was "Minnigrey" by the less well-known John Frederick Smith that made this weekly achieve hitherto unprecedented sales of 500,000 a week.

Artists George Frederick Sargent, John Proctor and (even more significantly) John Gilbert contributed to engravings in The London Journal.
