= James Henderson (publisher) =

Scottish proprietor and publisher (1823–1906)

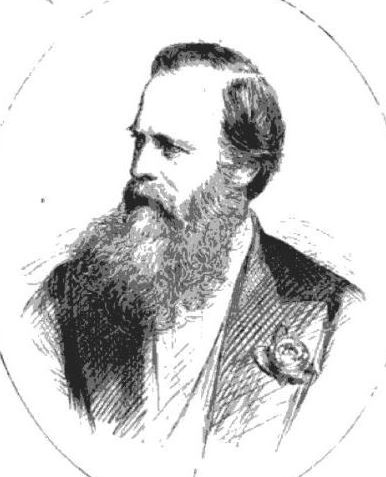
- Born: 26 November 1823; Laurencekirk, Kincardineshire, Scotland
- Died: 24 February 1906 (aged 82); Worthing, Sussex, England
- Occupations: Newspaper and magazine publisher
- Years active: c.1850s–1900

James Henderson (26 November 1823 – 24 February 1906) was a British newspaper and magazine proprietor and publisher, who was influential in developing the popular press and comics in Britain. He established James Henderson & Sons Ltd, which published many newspapers and magazines as well as books and postcards.

== Biography ==
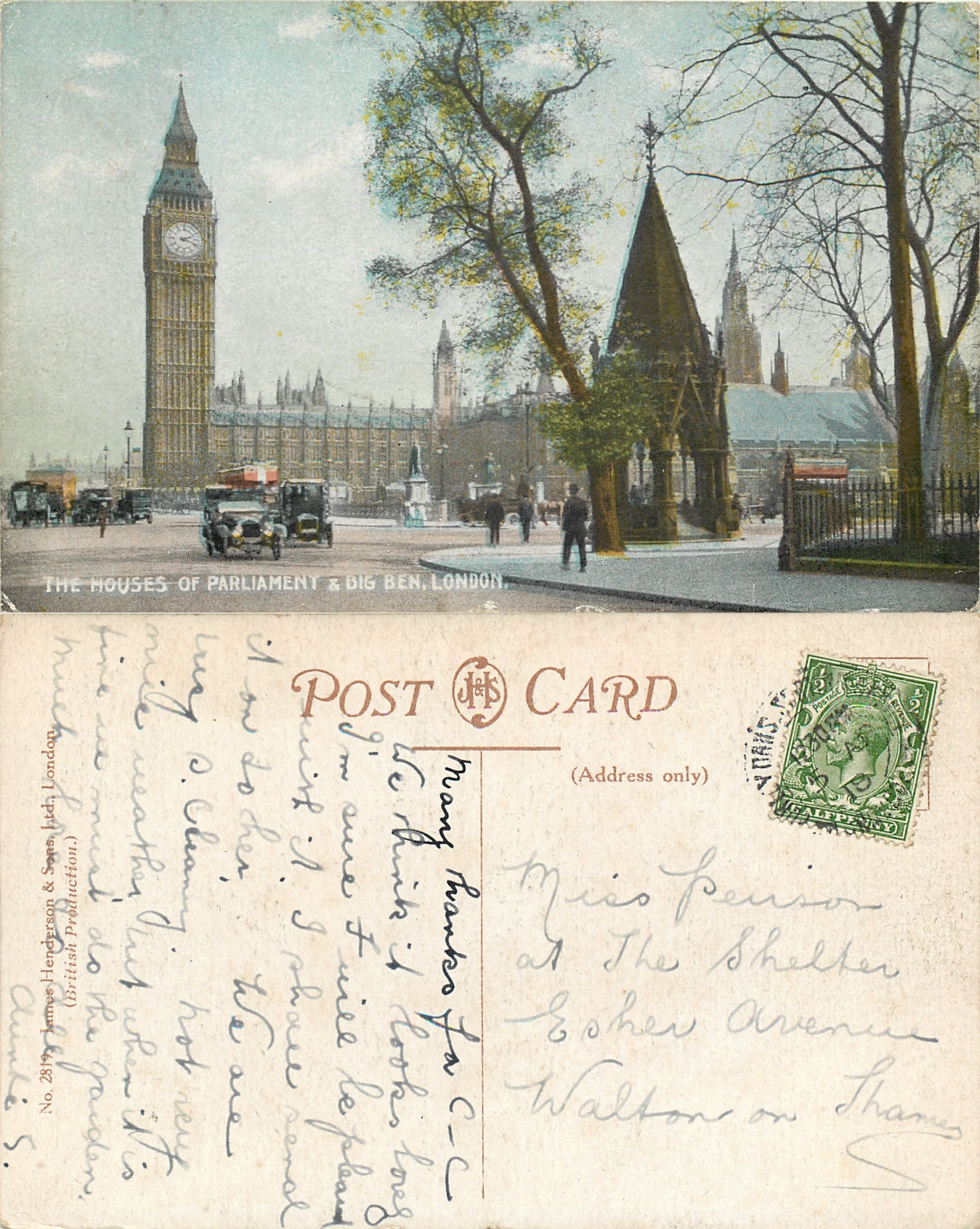
Houses of Parliament and Big Ben, James Henderson & Sons postcard, sent 1918

Henderson was born in Laurencekirk, near Montrose in Scotland. After working for his father, a saddle maker, he took a post with the local newspaper, the Montrose Standard. He then moved to Glasgow where he worked on the North British Daily Mail and for a publishing company, before setting up his own business. In 1855, he launched the Glasgow Daily News, the first daily penny newspaper in Britain, and The Weekly News and General Advertiser. However, neither succeeded for long, and his business collapsed.

He moved to England and worked at the Leeds Express and Manchester Guardian. At the Guardian, he was sent into the Lancashire towns to find out whether there was a demand for the daily newspaper to be circulated there. He found that there was little demand for a daily newspaper, but that "what was wanted was a weekly paper which, whilst giving a certain amount of news, should contain a considerable proportion of light amusing reading."

Accordingly, Henderson founded his own journal, The Weekly Budget (originally The North British Weekly Budget), in Manchester in January 1861. The newspaper contained both news items and fiction, and sold well. Its success led Henderson to move to Red Lion Court in Fleet Street in London in 1862, and by the end of the following year the Weekly Budget had a claimed circulation of 150,000, rising to 300,000 in subsequent years.

Henderson and his family moved to Dulwich in 1864. He had a large villa, Adon Mount, built for himself, and developed neighbouring fields into a residential area. He also started the South London Press and Evening Mercury newspapers, and several other magazines including The Key, The Orb, and the Household Monthly Magazine.

In 1871, as a spin-off from the Weekly Budget, Henderson started the Young Folks magazine, which was again highly successful. It published, in serial form, three novels by the initially-unknown Scottish author Robert Louis Stevenson - Treasure Island (first published in 17 instalments, from October 1881), The Black Arrow (1883). and Kidnapped (1886). They were initially published under the pseudonym "Captain James North". Other stories in Young Folks were written by Richard Quittenton ("Roland Quiz"; 1833–1914) and Walter Viles ("Walter Villiers"; 1850–1884), with illustrations by John Proctor ("Puck"; 1836–1914). Another contributor to Young Folks was Alfred Harmsworth, who wrote nearly 80 articles for the magazine and later founded the Daily Mail.

Henderson also published Funny Folks, from 1874 to 1894, in later years edited by Charles Pearce. Writer Denis Gifford considered Funny Folks to be the first British comic, though at first it tackled topical and political subjects along the same lines as Punch. The magazine was heavily illustrated, with cartoons by John Proctor among others, and benefitted from innovations in the use of cheap paper and photo-zincography printing.

Another publication by Henderson was Scraps, a compendium of items aimed at children, many from foreign sources, and published between 1883 and 1910. When Harmsworth published the similar Comic Cuts a few years later, Henderson sued him for plagiarism. Henderson also published the popular magazine Nuggets, which featured cartoons and stories about a fictional family of Irish immigrants in London, the Hooligans, which would now be considered examples of anti-Irish bigotry. Other journals published by Henderson during his lifetime included Penny Pictorial, Prize Paper, and Magnet.

In 1887, Henderson stood for election to Parliament as the Liberal Party candidate in the Dulwich by-election, but was defeated by the Conservative candidate, John Blundell Maple. Henderson's three sons became involved in the business. His son Nelson (1865–1943) – who also played rugby for London Scottish F.C. and Scotland – took over several of the magazines and later became chairman of the family company, James Henderson & Sons Ltd, which was formally established in 1899. Another brother, Winfred Stanley Henderson (1869–1941) was managing director of the company.

James Henderson retired to Worthing in Sussex, in about 1900. He died there in 1906, aged 82.

== James Henderson & Sons ==
The South London Press was sold to outside interests in 1907, and in 1910 the Weekly Budget was sold to American publisher Randolph Hearst. Hendersons continued as a company producing comics, books, greetings cards and postcards until 1920, when the business was taken over by Harmsworth's Amalgamated Press and went into voluntary liquidation.
