= Weekly Budget =

British journal

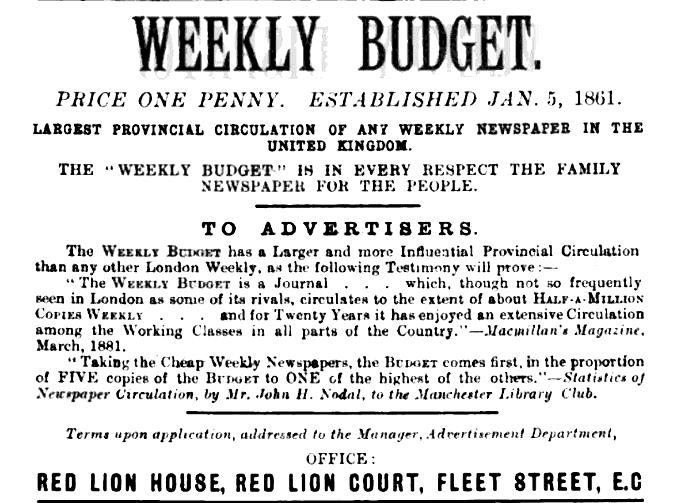
- 1881 advertisement for the Weekly Budget
- Categories: News, commentary, light fiction, answers
- Frequency: Weekly
- Founder: James Henderson
- Founded: 1861
- First issue: 5 January 1861
- Final issue: 1910
- Country: United Kingdom
- Based in: London (initially Manchester)
- Language: English

The Weekly Budget, originally the North British Weekly Budget, was a journal published in Britain between 1861 and 1910. It combined news with commentary, fictional stories, cartoons and puzzles. It was founded by James Henderson and published by his company, in later years James Henderson & Sons Ltd.

Henderson had set up newspapers in Scotland before coming south to work on the Manchester Guardian. There, he was sent into the Lancashire towns to find out whether there was a demand for the daily newspaper to be circulated more widely. He found that there was little demand for a daily newspaper, but that "what was wanted was a weekly paper which, whilst giving a certain amount of news, should contain a considerable proportion of light amusing reading." Accordingly, Henderson founded his own journal, The North British Weekly Budget, in January 1861.

The newspaper, priced at 1d., contained both news items and fiction, and sold well. Its success led Henderson to move from Manchester to Red Lion Court in Fleet Street in London in 1862, and by the end of the following year the Weekly Budget had a claimed circulation of 150,000. By 1865 it was claimed that the Budget had the largest provincial circulation of any British newspaper. As well as news and commentary "from the moderate Liberal point of view", large parts of the paper were devoted to serial novels, and to answering readers' questions.

The newspaper's success led to Henderson publishing a wide range of other periodicals, including the spin-off prototype children's journals and comics Young Folks and Funny Folks. His publishing company expanded into also producing books and postcards. Henderson retired in 1900 and died in 1906. In 1910, his sons sold the rights to the Weekly Budget to the American publisher Randolph Hearst.
