= John Frederick Smith =

John Frederick Smith (1806–1890) was an English novelist, who has been called "England's most popular novelist of the mid-nineteenth century". Smith became famous for his serializations in The London Journal.

Smith edited Martin Luther and the Reformation in Germany until the Close of the Diet of Worms (1889), which was begun by Charles Beard but left extremely incomplete due to his death in 1888.

== Works ==
- Stanfield Hall (serialized 1849 in The London Journal; 3 vols, 1888–89)
- Minnigrey (1851–52)
- Will and the Way
- Woman and her Master (1853)
- Temptation
