= South London Press =

Newspaper published in London, England

South London Press, London Weekly News & Mercury
- Type: Weekly newspaper
- Format: Tabloid
- Owner: MSI Media Limited
- Founder: James Henderson
- Founded: 1865
- Ceased publication: 2025
- Language: English
- Headquarters: Unit 112, 160 Bromley Road, Catford London SE6 2NZ
- Circulation: 63,000 (Fridays) (as of July 2017)
- Website: londonnewsonline.org.uk

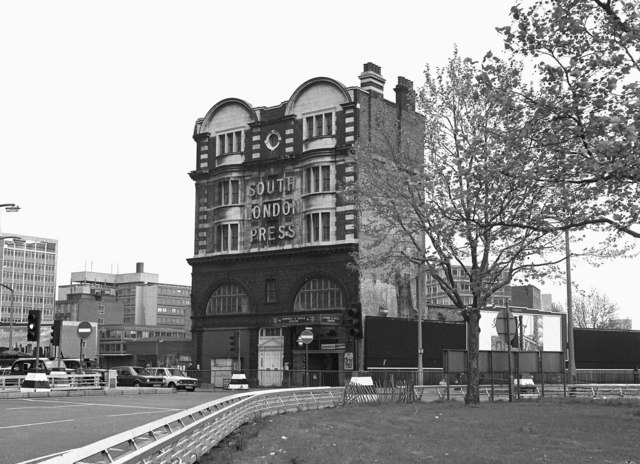
The original South London Press building based in Elephant & Castle

The South London Press, London Weekly News and Mercury (formerly South London Press) was a weekly newspaper published in South East London. The newspaper covered news, sports and features within the south, central and west London area from 1865 to 2025.

== History ==
The newspaper was first published by James Henderson in 1865.

Between 2007 and 2016 the paper was part of the Tindle Group, which bought it from Trinity Mirror. The paper was then purchased between 2017 and 2019 by Street Runners Ltd.

In 2017 the newspaper entered a 'media partnership' with Millwall F.C.

In 2019, the Greenwich Mercury was merged into the Press.

The paper ceased in May 2025.

== Notable staff ==
Many of its former reporters have gone on to make careers in Fleet Street, and it is still considered a training ground for the nationals. Max Wall and then Richard Woolveridge edited the bi-weekly in its glory days when its circulation was over 130,000. The novelist and critic Martyn Bedford used to work in the Lewisham office of the paper, while Brian Alexander, the former sports editor of The Sun and Mail on Sunday, was sports editor until 1986. Paul McCarthy, sports editor of the News of the World, John Pienaar, political correspondent and reporter on BBC Radio 5 Live, and David Bond, who was appointed as the BBC's sports editor in 2010, worked at the SLP in the 1980s and 1990s. Others who went on to Fleet Street include Ken Reynolds, Steve Grimes, George Binyon, Willie Robertson, John Twomey, Ian Malin, Debbie Andalo, Brian Stater, Ev Bramble, Carolyn Jones, Anna Pukas, JJ Young, Jonathan Buckmaster, Chris Ward, Stewart Morris, Claire Aaron, Anton La Guardia, Brian McConnell, Peter Burden, Ron Ricketts, Geoff Manners, John Rodda and Colin Wood. Publicist Max Clifford was also an employee.

== Awards ==
The South London Press won the Press Gazette Regional Press Awards 2009 Newspaper of the Year for weekly newspapers above 20,000 circulation.

== See also ==
- List of newspapers in London
