= Funny Folks =

British periodical

- Categories: Humour, satire
- Frequency: Weekly
- Publisher: James Henderson
- Founded: 1874
- Final issue: 1894
- Country: UK

Funny Folks was a British periodical published between 1874 and 1894. It was published in London by Scottish newspaper proprietor James Henderson. It has been called "the first English 'comic' paper", and "the model for all later British comics".

The first issue, on 12 December 1874, was produced as a supplement to the special Christmas edition of Henderson's weekly magazine The Weekly Budget. Its popularity led to its subsequent publication as a free-standing periodical, priced at 1d. per copy. It was subtitled A Weekly Budget of Funny Pictures, Funny Notes, Funny Jokes, Funny Stories.

The newspaper-format journal was innovative in combining entertaining stories and puzzles with large cartoons. These were often satirical in tone, with some by John Proctor, known as Puck, and some from German and French sources. It was aimed at an adult lower middle-class audience, rather than at children, and benefitted from innovations in the use of cheap paper and photo-zincography printing. One of the contributors to the journal was Alfred Harmsworth, who launched his own Comic Cuts a few years later.
