= George Stiff =

English engraver and newspaper proprietor

George Stiff (1807–1873) was an English engraver and newspaper proprietor.

Stiff worked as a foreman of the engravers in the Illustrated London News before becoming a newspaper proprietor himself in the 1840s. A paper called The Illustrated Weekly Times failed after a few weeks, but The London Journal (started in 1845) was a huge success as a penny fiction weekly. By 1847 Stiff was able to begin the Weekly Times: this "would eventually become one of the four high-circulation threepenny Sunday papers which dominated the mid-century middle-market for news, with Reynolds's [Weekly] Newspaper (1850-1923), Lloyd's Weekly Newspaper (1842-1918), and the News of the World (1843-1910)."
