= Young Folks (magazine) =

British children's magazine

- Page from Young Folks, vol. 19.
- Former editors: James Henderson; Clinton Leighton; Richard Quittenton (Roland Quiz)
- Founder: James Henderson
- Founded: 1871
- First issue: 1 January 1871; 155 years ago
- Final issue: 29 April 1897; 129 years ago
- Country: United Kingdom
- Language: English

Young Folks was a weekly children's literary magazine published in the United Kingdom between 1871 and 1897. Its publishing office was initially in Manchester, then relocated to London in 1873. It is most notable for having first published a number of novels by Robert Louis Stevenson in serial form, including Treasure Island, Kidnapped, and The Black Arrow.

== Demographic appeal and price ==
It enjoyed a wide demographic appeal, as the test of time as shown, unique compared to contemporary publications. First sold for one half-penny with eight pages, the price was increased to one penny in 1873 and the page count increased to sixteen. Its motto was To Inform, To Instruct, To Amuse.

== Different names over the years ==
Young Folks went under a number of different names in its 26-year history:

- Our Young Folks' Weekly Budget (1 January 1871 – 28 June 1879) (447 editions)
  - as Young Folks' Weekly Budget (1876–1879)
  - as Young Folks' Budget (1879)
- Young Folks (5 July 1879 – 20 December 1884) (326 editions)
- Young Folks' Paper (27 December 1884 – 28 June 1891)
- Old and Young (4 July 1891 – 11 September 1896)
- Folks at Home (18 September 1896 – 29 April 1897)

== Serialised stories ==
The proprietor and sometimes editor of the magazine was James Henderson. Young Folks serialised Treasure Island in Volumes 19 and 20 from 1 October 1881 to 28 January 1882. It ran under the title Treasure Island; or, the mutiny of the Hispaniola and under the pseudonym Captain George North. It made little difference to the sales of the magazine. Robert Leighton recalled that: "The boy readers did not like the story. As a serial it was a failure. Boys like a story to plunge at once into the active excitement . . ."

The Black Arrow—published under the same pseudonym—was serialised between 30 June and 30 October 1883. As a serial it was, unlike Treasure Island, a huge success. Kidnapped was serialised in the magazine from May to July 1886.

== Editors ==
Editor's name	Years
Robert Leighton	1884–85

Other editors were Clinton Leighton and Richard Quittenton (22 November 1833 – 23 January 1914) who wrote under the pseudonym Roland Quiz and worked on the magazine for 42 years.

== Artists ==
John Proctor (AKA 'Puck') was a regular contributor in the 1870s.
