= Julia Boynton Green =

American poet

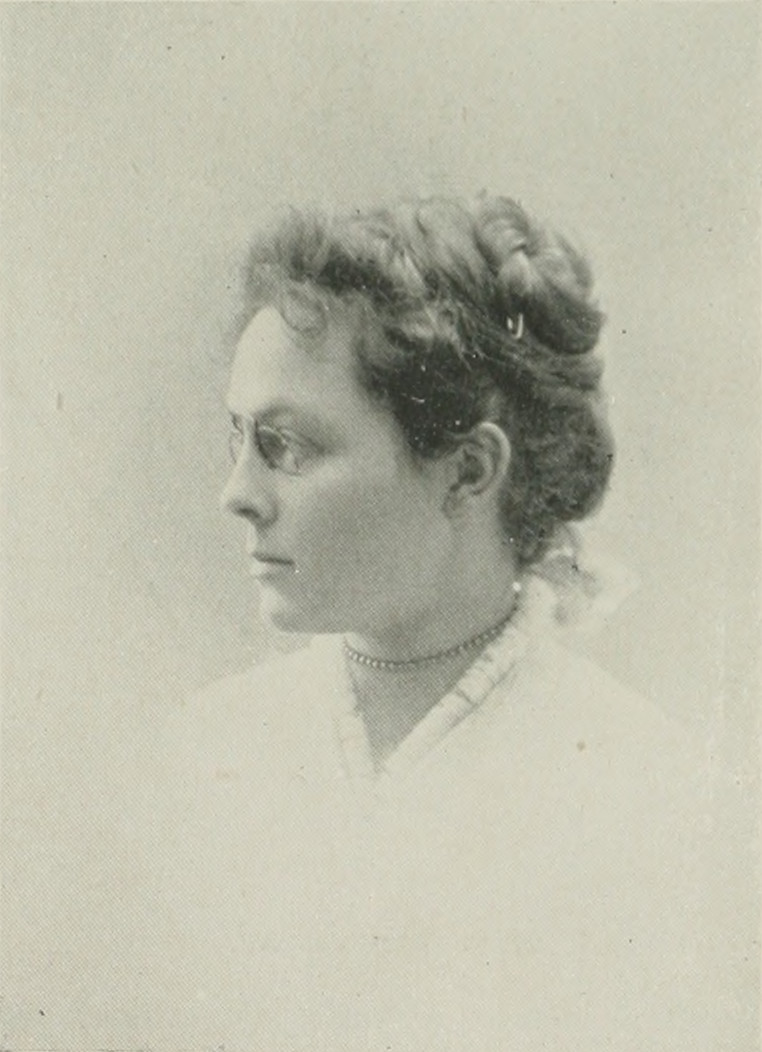
- Photo in A Woman of the Century
- Born: Julia P. Boynton; May 25, 1861; South Byron, New York, U.S.
- Died: July 10, 1957 (aged 96); Los Angeles, California, U.S.
- Resting place: Hollywood Forever Cemetery
- Occupations: author, poet
- Spouse: Levi Worthington Green (m. 1890)
- Relatives: Nathanial Greene
- Writing career
- Language: English

Julia Boynton Green (née, Boynton; May 25, 1861 – July 10, 1957) was an American author and poet. She is remembered as an "anti-modernist who railed against free verse". She was the author of a volume of poems entitled Lines and Interlines (1887), as well as two other books, This Enchanted Coast: Verse on California Themes (1928) and Noonmark (1936).

== Early life and education ==
Julia P. Boynton was born in South Byron, New York, (Note: According to Yaszek & Sharp (2016), Green was born in Boston.) May 25, 1861. Her father was James T. Boynton (d. 1889). She had at least one sibling, a sister, Mrs. A. H. Green. She was a descendant of Nathanial Greene, major general of the Continental Army in the American Revolutionary War. (Note: Nathanial Greene's family branch dropped the final e from the surname.)

When she was fifteen years old, she and her older sister entered Ingham University, in LeRoy, New York, where they remained a year as students. Another year was spent by both in preparation for Wellesley College. After entering that institution, they were called home after the father's death. Their interrupted course of study was continued for several years, chiefly in Nyack. She afterwards passed two winters in New York in the study of art, followed by a season in London, England.

== Career ==
Most of Green's work appeared in local journals and in the Boston Transcript. In 1887, she published a volume of poems, Lines and Interlines (New York, 1887). In 1888, she was preparing for an extended tour in Europe, when she was called home by the illness of her mother, who subsequently died. She married Levi Worthington Green in June, 1890, and after a six-months' tour in Europe, they made their home in Rochester, New York.

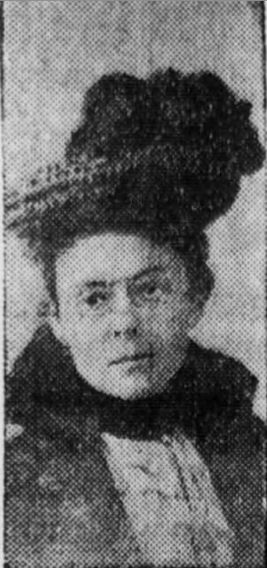
Julia Boynton Green (1905)

In 1893, she removed to Redlands, where her husband became a Southern California pioneer orange rancher and author. Their three children were Gladys, Boynton, and Norman. By 1929, the couple and their daughter had removed to Westwood, as their daughter was working as a librarian at University of California, Los Angeles.

She published a second book of poetry, This Enchanted Coast: Verse on California Themes, in 1928 in Los Angeles. Noonmark was published in Redlands, in 1936. In 1941, she received an honorable mention from the Los Angeles branch of the League of American Penwomen, as well as a prize from the national contest of American Penwomen.

== Death and legacy ==
Julia P. Boynton Green died July 10, 1957, in Los Angeles, and is buried at Hollywood Forever Cemetery. Her papers and three unpublished books are collected at the Huntington Library.

The L. Worthington Green/Julia Boynton Home, built in 1911, received the 1986 Heritage Award from the Redlands Area Historical Society.

== Selected works ==
=== By Julia P. Boynton ===
- Lines and Interlines, 1887

=== By Julia Boynton Green ===
- This Enchanted Coast: Verse on California Themes, 1928
- Noonmark, 1936
