= The Black Arrow: A Tale of the Two Roses =

1888 novel by Robert Louis Stevenson

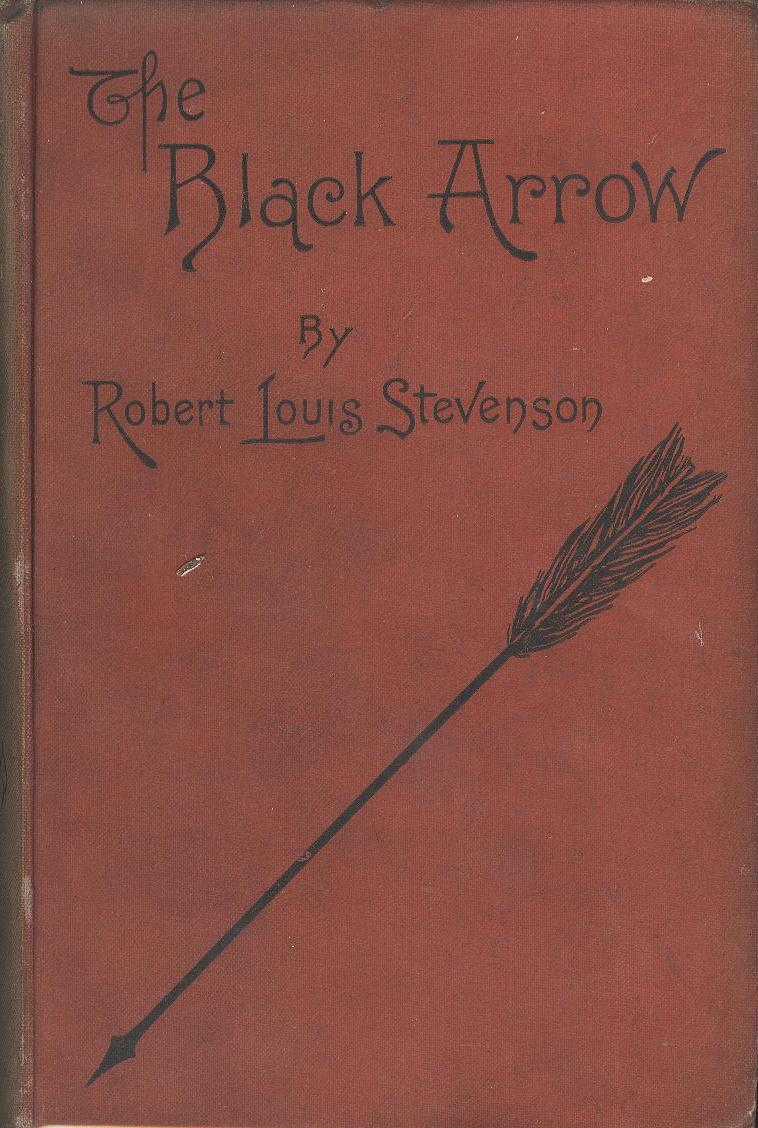
- Author: Robert Louis Stevenson
- Language: English
- Genre: Historical, Adventure, Romance novel
- Publisher: Charles Scribner's Sons (US) & Cassell (UK)
- Publication date: 1888
- Publication place: United Kingdom
- Media type: book
- Pages: 392 (first edition)
- Preceded by: serial periodical article
- Text: The Black Arrow: A Tale of the Two Roses at Wikisource

The Black Arrow: A Tale of the Two Roses is an adventure, romance and historical novel by Robert Louis Stevenson. It first appeared as a serial in 1883 with the subtitle "A Tale of Tunstall Forest" beginning in Young Folks; A Boys' and Girls' Paper of Instructive and Entertaining Literature, vol. XXII, no. 656 (Saturday, 30 June 1883) and ending in vol. XXIII, no. 672 (Saturday, 20 October 1883)—Stevenson had finished writing it by the end of summer. It was printed under the pseudonym Captain George North. He alludes to the time gap between the serialisation and the publication as one volume in 1888 in his preface "Critic [parodying Dickens's 'Cricket'] on the Hearth": "The tale was written years ago for a particular audience..." The Paston Letters were Stevenson's main literary source for The Black Arrow. The Black Arrow consists of 79,926 words.

== Premise ==
Richard (Dick) Shelton during the Wars of the Roses: becomes a knight, rescues his lady Joanna Sedley, and obtains justice for the murder of his father, Sir Harry Shelton. Outlaws in Tunstall Forest organised by Ellis Duckworth, whose weapon and calling card is a black arrow, cause Dick to suspect that his guardian Sir Daniel Brackley and his retainers are responsible for his father's murder. Dick's suspicions are enough to turn Sir Daniel against him, so he has no recourse but to escape from Sir Daniel and join the outlaws of the Black Arrow against him. This struggle sweeps him up into the greater conflict surrounding them all.

== Plot summary ==
A crucial moment in the novel when Sir Oliver, Sir Daniel, and Dick Shelton are surprised by a black arrow in the Moat House refectory hall

The novel is set in the reign of "old King Henry VI" (1422–1461, 1470–1471) and during the Wars of the Roses (1455–1487), between 1460 and 1461. The story begins with the Tunstall Moat House alarm bell, rung to summon recruits for its absent lord Sir Daniel Brackley, to join the Battle of Risingham; at which the outlaw "fellowship" known as "the Black Arrow" begins to strike with its "four black arrows" for the "four black hearts" of Brackley and three of his retainers: Nicholas Appleyard, Bennet Hatch, and Sir Oliver Oates, the parson. The rhyme posted in explanation of this attack makes the protagonist Richard ('Dick') Shelton, ward of Sir Daniel, curious about the death of his father Sir Harry Shelton. Having been dispatched to Kettley, where Sir Daniel was quartered, and sent to Tunstall Moat House by return dispatch, he falls in with a fugitive, Joanna Sedley, disguised as a boy with the alias of John Matcham: an heiress kidnapped by Sir Daniel to obtain guardianship over her and to retain his control over Richard by marrying her to him.

As they travel through Tunstall Forest, Joanna tries to persuade Dick to turn against Sir Daniel in sympathy with the Black Arrow outlaws, whose camp they discover near the ruins of Grimstone manor. The next day they are met in the forest by Sir Daniel himself, disguised as a leper and returning to the Moat House after his side was defeated at Risingham. Dick and Joanna then follow Sir Daniel to the Moat House. Here Dick confirms that Sir Daniel is the murderer of his father, and escapes injured from the Moat House. He is rescued by the outlaws of the Black Arrow.

Cover of the first Scribner Brothers' American edition of 1888

The second half of the novel, books 3–5, tells how Dick rescues Joanna from Sir Daniel with the help of both the Black Arrow fellowship and the Yorkist army led by Richard Crookback, Duke of Gloucester, the future Richard III of England. The action centre is Shoreby on the North Sea coast, where the Lancastrian forces are entrenched. While shadowing Sir Daniel, Dick and the outlaws encounter another group of spies interested in Joanna: her lawful guardian, Lord Foxham, and his retainers. Dick and his outlaws defeat Foxham in a night skirmish. Foxham in accordance with knightly honor agrees to yield himself to Dick at St. Bride's Cross outside Shoreby the next day. They become fast friends, and Foxham promises Joanna to Dick in marriage after a contemplated seaside rescue. This enterprise fails, leaving Foxham wounded and unable to personally help Dick. He writes Dick a letter of recommendation to the Yorkist leader, Duke Richard Crookback.

In book 4, "The Disguise," Dick and his outlaw companion, Lawless, disguise themselves as friars to get into Sir Daniel's Shoreby mansion to visit Joanna. They discover that the next morning Sir Daniel will give Joanna in marriage to his fellow Lancastrian magnate, Lord Shoreby, and word is sent to Ellis Duckworth, the outlaw chief. Complications arise as Lawless gets drunk and Lord Shoreby's spy, Rutter, noses around Sir Daniel's mansion, discovering telltale evidence of Dick and Lawless's intrusion. Dick kills Rutter, and security in the mansion is heightened when his body is discovered. Dick and Lawless end up in the custody of Sir Oliver, who tells Dick that he is free to leave provided the wedding of Lord Shoreby and Joanna takes place as planned. When Black Arrow archers disrupt the wedding, killing the bridegroom, Dick and Lawless are turned over to Sir Daniel. Dick claims sanctuary from Sir Daniel in the abbey church, but, in the end, yields himself and Lawless to a more impartial judge, the Lancastrian magnate, Earl Risingham. Dick gains freedom for himself and Lawless when he produces evidence to Earl Risingham that Sir Daniel is a double-dealing traitor.

Crookback makes his appearance in book 5. As Dick is leaving Shoreby he sees Crookback holding his own against seven or eight Lancastrian assailants, and assists his victory. Dick's accurate knowledge of the Lancastrian forces in Shoreby aid Crookback in winning the battle that he wages later that day. Dick is also successful as one of Crookback's commanders. Crookback knights Dick on the field of battle and, following their victory, gives him fifty horsemen to pursue Sir Daniel, who has escaped Shoreby with Joanna. Dick succeeds in rescuing Joanna, but loses his men in the process. He and Joanna make their way to Holywood where they are married. In this way Dick fulfills his initial pledge to Joanna to convey her safely to Holywood.

In the early morning of his wedding day Dick encounters a fugitive Sir Daniel trying to enter the Holywood seaport to escape to France or Burgundy. Because it is his wedding day, Dick does not want to soil his hands with Sir Daniel's blood, so he simply bars his way by challenging him either to hand-to-hand combat or alerting a Yorkist perimeter patrol. Sir Daniel retreats but is shot with the final black arrow by Ellis Duckworth who had been following him. Thereafter, Sir Richard and Lady Shelton live in Tunstall Moat House untroubled by the rest of the Wars of the Roses. Lawless is pensioned and settled in Tunstall hamlet, where he does a volte face by returning to the Franciscan order and taking the name Brother Honestus.

== Characters ==
Title page of the first edition of 1888, US edition a few weeks before the UK edition

- Richard (Dick) Shelton – (the protagonist) son of the late Sir Harry Shelton, heir of Tunstall. He is "not yet eighteen" in May 1460, the time period of the first part of the narrative. He is described as "sun-browned and grey-eyed." He is looked upon as the leader of the Black Arrow outlaws in Shoreby as they attempt to rescue Joanna Sedley from Sir Daniel. He is knighted by Richard Crookback in the course of the Battle of Shoreby.
- Clipsby – a saucy Tunstall peasant. He is the first character in the novel to alert Dick to the dishonesty of his guardian Daniel Brackley: "Y'are a lad; but when ye come to a man's inches, ye will find ye have an empty pocket."
- Bennet Hatch – a middle aged retainer of Sir Daniel Brackley and bailiff of the hundred comprising Tunstall. He is described as "a brown-faced, grizzled fellow, heavy of hand and grim of mien."
- Nicholas Appleyard – a septuagenarian veteran of the Battle of Agincourt (1415): "his face was like a walnut-shell, both for colour and wrinkles; but his old grey eye was still clear enough, and his sight unabated."
- Sir Oliver Oates – the local Tunstall parson and Sir Daniel's clerk. A "tall, portly, ruddy, black-eyed man of near fifty." He is portrayed in the novel as a cowardly sycophant of Sir Daniel Brackley. His knowledge of the law facilitates Sir Daniel's political and financial gain.
- Sir Daniel Brackley – (the antagonist) a self-serving, unscrupulous knight, notoriously known for changing allegiances from Lancaster to York and vice versa "continually" as it suited him to obtain "some increase of fortune." He also garnered income by taking rents from lands that came into his hands. He enriched himself by obtaining wardships of rich heirs in their minority such as Dick Shelton and procuring rich marriages for them. His vacillating character partly resembles that of the historic Earl Thomas Stanley and his brother Sir William Stanley in the Wars of the Roses. However Sir Daniel was different from the Stanleys in that he was not a simple opportunist but a devious, avaricious villain. He is described by the author as having a bald head and a "thin, dark visage." He is also described in positive terms as "a very merry knight, none merrier in England" and as a good military leader. His lady wife appears in one or two episodes of the novel.
- The Walsinghams – Stevenson's renaming of the Woodvilles of the Wars of the Roses. They do not play a part in the narrative of The Black Arrow, but it is intimated that in the recent past ("till two years ago, come Candlemas," i.e. two years before 2 February 1461) they had exercised lordship and received rents in Tunstall and Kettley. They are described as "poor as thieves." The Woodville family during the Wars of the Roses was poor in being composed largely of commoners, ennobled by marriage under Edward IV of England.
- Joanna Sedley – (the heroine) also known as John Matcham, the ward of Lord Foxham but kidnapped by Sir Daniel. She is sixteen in May 1460. Her softness and diminutive frame are constantly alluded to in book 1 as unbecoming to her masculine attire, but later this is set in contrast to her appearance and bearing as a noble young lady: "she, who had seemed so little and so awkward in the attire of Matcham, was now tall like a young willow, and swam across the floor as though she scorned the drudgery of walking."
- Selden – Sir Daniel's retainer and right-hand man in Kettley. He is a dear friend of Bennet Hatch and Dick Shelton. Sir Daniel dispatched him and six others to recapture Joanna Sedley after her flight, but they are killed in a Black Arrow ambush.
- Will Lawless – a "Friar Tuck" type of outlaw, member of the Black Arrow Fellowship, who has been many things in life, including a seaman and a Franciscan friar. He is said to have a big body, and he is fond of drinking. He helps Dick Shelton visit his beloved Joanna by disguising him as a friar. The final paragraph tells how he ended life as a friar. As a friar he assumes a name that indicates his conversion from thief to honest man, Brother Honestus.
- Ellis Duckworth – organiser of the Black Arrow Fellowship to avenge Harry Shelton, Simon Malmesbury, and himself. He was blamed for the death of Harry Shelton, and he was rumoured to have been an agent of Richard Neville, Earl of Warwick.
- Kit (Christopher) Greensheve – a Black Arrow outlaw who, like Lawless, is closely associated with Dick Shelton.
- John Capper – a Black Arrow outlaw closely associated with Dick Shelton.
- Goody Hatch – wife of Bennet Hatch, who is put in charge of Joanna Sedley when she comes to the Moat House with Dick Shelton.
- Lord Foxham– a local Yorkist magnate, guardian of Joanna Sedley, who joins with Dick Shelton and the outlaws in their failed attempt to rescue her.
- Sir John Hamley – kinsman of Lord Foxham and his intended bridegroom for his ward Joanna Sedley. At the end of the novel he becomes betrothed to Alicia Risingham.
- Hawksley – Lord Foxham's retainer. He cares for his master on The Good Hope after the failed attempt to rescue Joanna Sedley from the house by the sea.
- Earl Risingham – a local Lancastrian magnate, uncle of Alicia Risingham, killed in the Battle of Shoreby.
- Alicia Risingham – niece of Earl Risingham and friend, confidant, and companion of Joanna Sedley. She coquettishly poses herself for romantic consideration by Dick Shelton, who graciously declines in favour of his true love Joanna. She is so short of stature that she jokingly refers to herself as a "dwarf."
- Lord Shoreby – a local Lancastrian magnate, killed by Black Arrow outlaws in Shoreby Abbey Church to prevent his marriage to Joanna Sedley.
- Rutter – Lord Shoreby's spy, killed by Dick Shelton.
- Captain Arblaster – the owner of the ship The Good Hope, stolen by Shelton and the Black Arrow Fellowship. Dick's favour with Richard Crookback allows him to plead successfully for his life after the Battle of Shoreby, but this in turn causes Dick to fall out of favour with Crookback. Arblaster, untouched by his kindness, bitterly points out that if not for Dick stealing his ship, he would not need to be saved in the first place. He ends life as a pensioner in Tunstall Hamlet.
- Tom – Captain Arblaster's first mate, who is killed in the Battle of Shoreby. It is Tom who is first suspicious of Dick and Lawless as they are making their way to the "Goat and Bagpipes" alehouse, and it is he that succeeds in catching Dick. Arblaster and Pirret do not heed his warning against Dick tricking them through his Ali Baba tale.
- Master Pirret – friend of Captain Arblaster, whose greed and credulity allow Dick to escape from him, Arblaster, and Tom.
- Richard Crookback – Richard Plantagenet, Duke of Gloucester, future King Richard III of England (a historical person).
- Sir William Catesby – Richard Crookback's retainer (a historical person).

== Chronology and geography ==
From the information given in the novel two time references for the two blocks of action that constitute the narrative can be pinpointed: May 1460 and January 1461. The important time indicator is the Battle of Wakefield, 30 December 1460, which Stevenson describes in the first chapter of Book 3:

Months had passed away since Richard Shelton made his escape from the hands of his guardian. These months had been eventful for England. The party of Lancaster, which was then in the very article of death, had once more raised its head. The Yorkists defeated and dispersed, their leader butchered on the field, it seemed, – for a very brief season in the winter following upon the events already recorded, as if the House of Lancaster had finally triumphed over its foes.

It is because Richard Crookback (later Richard III of England) is presented as an adult active in the Wars of the Roses in January 1461 that Stevenson provides the footnote: "At the date of this story, Richard Crookback could not have been created Duke of Gloucester; but for clearness, with the reader's leave, he shall so be called." Richard was born in 1452, so he would have been merely 8 years old at the time of this story. A later footnote emphasises this again: "Richard Crookback would have been really far younger at this date [i.e. January, 1461]." Stevenson follows William Shakespeare in retrojecting Richard of Gloucester into an earlier period of the Wars of the Roses and portraying him as a dour hunchback—Stevenson: "the formidable hunchback." (See Henry VI, part 2; Henry VI, part 3; and Richard III.) This characterisation closely follows the Tudor myth, a tradition that overly vilified Richard of Gloucester and cast the entire English Fifteenth century as a bloody, barbaric chaos in contrast to the Tudor era of law and order.

The 1948 film The Black Arrow portrays Richard of Gloucester in a more favourable light than in the novel, somewhat anticipating the work of Paul Murray Kendall to rehabilitate him (Kendall, Richard III, 1956). When Richard is told he is "more than kind," he replies jokingly that such rumours would ruin his [bad] "reputation": the revision of the Tudor myth?

Stevenson liked his characterisation of Richard Crookback, and expressed his desire to write about him again. Stevenson alludes both to his novel The Black Arrow and Richard Crookback with the phrase "the Sable Missile" in a letter he wrote Sidney Colvin in the month the final instalment of The Black Arrow appeared in Young Folks (October 1883):

Your remarks on The Black Arrow are to the point. I am pleased you liked Crookback; he is a fellow whose hellish energy has always fired my attention. I wish Shakespeare had written the play after he had learned some of the rudiments of literature and art rather than before. Some day, I will re-tickle the Sable Missile, and shoot it, moyennant finances [tr: "for a [financial] consideration"], once more into the air; I can lighten it of much, and devote some more attention to Dick o' Gloucester. It's great sport to write tushery.

The Battle of Shoreby, a fictitious battle that is the main event of Book 5, is modelled after the First Battle of St Albans in the Wars of the Roses. This battle in history as in the novel was a victory for the House of York. The presence of an abbey church in Shoreby is reminiscent of the abbey church of Tewkesbury to which the Lancastrians fled for sanctuary after the battle on 4 May 1471.

In the "prologue" Stevenson intimates that the Tunstall of The Black Arrow is a real place: "Tunstall hamlet at that period, in the reign of old King Henry VI., wore much the same appearance as it wears today." In south-east Suffolk, England, 18 miles NE of Ipswich, less than 10 miles from the North Sea a "Tunstall" is located with an accompanying forest. Stevenson and his family had visited Suffolk in 1873. The similarity of place-names near this Tunstall, Suffolk to place-names in the novel also suggest that this is Stevenson's Tunstall: Kettley, Risingham and Foxham are probably Kettleburgh, Framlingham and Farnham in actuality. The identities of Shoreby-on-the-Till and Holywood are probably Orford and Leiston respectively. Orford is on the North Sea and is joined to Framlingham by a road going to the northwest (the "highroad from Risingham to Shoreby"), and Leiston is also on the North Sea with a medieval abbey like Holywood of the novel. The River Till, which figures largely in book 1 of the novel, would then be the River Deben in actuality. The River Deben flows near Kettleburgh.

The name of the main character Richard Shelton and his inheritance, Tunstall, were the name and title of an actual historical personage, Sir Richard Tunstall. He, as a Lancastrian and ardent supporter of King Henry VI of England, held Harlech Castle against the Yorkists from 1465 to 1468 during the first part of Edward IV's reign. In contrast, Richard Shelton, who becomes the knight of Tunstall at the end of The Black Arrow, is a staunch Yorkist.

Two other anachronisms in the novel are Sir Oliver and others speaking of "Simnel" and "the Walsinghams" as suspected organizers of the Black Arrow fellowship. Lambert Simnel was the focus of rebellion in Henry VII's reign (1485–1509), and "the Walsinghams," Stevenson's renaming of the Woodvilles, would have played a part only after May 1464, when Edward IV married Elizabeth Woodville.

== Criticism ==
Stevenson himself was the first critic of his Black Arrow, referring to it as "tushery" with reference to his use of archaic English dialogue. Stevenson wrote in a May 1883 letter to H.E. Henley:

The influenza has busted me a good deal; I have no spring, and am headachy. So, as my good Red Lion Counter begged me for another Butcher's Boy-I turned me to-what thinkest 'ou?-to Tushery, by the mass! Ay, friend, a whole tale of tushery. And every tusher tushes me so free, that may I be tushed if the whole thing is worth a tush. The Black Arrow: A Tale of Tunstall Forest is his name: tush! a poor thing!

His wife Fanny is acknowledged in the fly-leaf as the "critic on the hearth".

Praise is rare for The Black Arrow among literary critics over its 140-year history, though novelist John Galsworthy wrote that it was "a livelier picture of medieval times than I remember elsewhere in fiction." The reason for this stems from Stevenson's own dislike of The Black Arrow coupled with a misunderstanding of his attitude toward what he called "tushery." In the introduction to the 2003 Signet Classic edition, Professor Gary Hoppenstand argues that The Black Arrow has been underappreciated, saying it is a "rich psychological novel" that is "deeper and more textured" than Treasure Island: "Those, however, who approach The Black Arrow as a rich psychological novel, similar in a number of ways to Stevenson's gothic masterpiece, The Strange Case of Dr. Jekyll and Mr. Hyde, will find a rewarding experience, one that offers insight into the complexity of the human condition."

== Annotated edition ==
On 18 December 2007 Penguin Books issued an historic first annotated edition of The Black Arrow with the introduction and notes by John Sutherland. Sutherland makes mention of the English Wikipedia article about the book in this edition. The book cover depicts two fifteenth century warriors battling with red and white roses for the two houses of Lancaster and York respectively. It can be noted that the white rose of the cover is larger than the red rose denoting the ascendancy of the House of York at the conclusion of the narrative. The illustration provides a symbolic representation of the title of the novel.

== Adaptations in other media ==
The Black Arrow has been adapted for film, television and other media several times, often very loosely. Adaptations include the following:

- 1911 film short directed by Oscar Apfel and starring Charles Ogle and Nathalie Jerome
- 1948 film starring Louis Hayward
- "The Black Arrow," an episode of the Mutual Broadcasting System radio series Family Theater, aired February 1, 1950
- 1951 two-part British TV serial starring Denis Quilley
- 1968 seven-part Italian TV production entitled La freccia nera
- 1972-1975 British TV series, starring successively Robin Langford and Simon Cuff as Richard Shelton during its run, Southern Colour Production
- 1985 film starring Oliver Reed and Benedict Taylor
- 1985 Soviet film Chyornaya strela (Black arrow)
- 1988 animated adaptation by Burbank Films Australia
- 2021 mention in Them miniseries, Episode 4, on Amazon Prime.

The Robert Louis Stevenson website maintains a complete list of derivative works.

== Editions ==
- 1883, UK, First Appearance, Published serially as The Black Arrow, A Tale of Tunstall Forest in Young Folks; A Boys' and Girls' Paper of Instructive and Entertaining Literature, vol. XXII, no. 656 through vol. XXIII, no. 672.
- 1888, UK, Cassell & Co., Ltd., hardback First Edition
- 1888, USA, Charles Scribner's Sons, hardback First U. S. Edition
- 1888, Leipzig Germany, Bernhard Tauchnitz, Collection of British and American Authors, Vol. 2548, First Paperback Edition (Tauchnitz also issued the book in hardcover format at the same time.)
- 1894, UK, Cassell & Co., Ltd., H.M. Paget, illus.
- 1895, 1897, 1899, 1905, 1910, 1912, 1914, 1917, 1921 USA, Charles Scribner's Sons, hardback
- 1916, 1933, 1942, USA, Charles Scribner's Sons (N.C. Wyeth illustrated edition), hardback
- 1923, USA, David McKay Company, hardback, illus.
- c1930?, UK, Eveleigh Nash and Grayson, London, (The Edinburgh Press) hardback
- 1930, UK/USA, Standard Book Company, hardback
- 1931, USA, Ginn and Company, hardback
- 1931, UK, Dent & Sons Ltd., hardback
- 1944, USA, Charles Scribner's Sons (N.C. Wyeth illus. ed. reprint) ISBN 0-684-18877-5, hardback
- 1950, USA, Pocket Books, Inc. (Scholastic Book Services), paperback
- 1954, USA, Nelson Doubleday (Lawrence Beall Smith, illus.), hardback
- 1963, USA, Airmont Publishing Co., Inc., paperback
- 1983, USA, Watermill Press ISBN 0-89375-781-0, paperback
- 1994, USA, Geddes & Grosset (Bloomsbury books) ISBN 1-85471-287-X, 9781854712875, paperback
- 1995, UK/USA Penguin Books ISBN 0-14-062164-4, ISBN 978-0-14-062164-8, paperback
- 1998, USA, Tom Doherty Associates, LLC. (Tor Classics) ISBN 0-8125-6562-2, paperback
- 2001, USA, Tantor Media ISBN 1-4001-0003-8, ISBN 978-1-4001-0003-3, audio CD
- 2001, USA, Tantor Media (MP3 Una edition) ISBN 1-4001-5003-5, ISBN 978-1-4001-5003-8, pub. date 1 June 2001, MP3 CD
- 2003, USA, IndyPublish.com ISBN 1-4043-6172-3, ISBN 978-1-4043-6172-0, pub. date 16 April 2003, paperback
- 2003, UK/USA, Signet Classics (Penguin group) ISBN 978-0-451-52916-9, pub. date December 2003, paperback
- 2004, USA, Audio Book Contractors, Inc. ISBN 1-55685-752-7, ISBN 978-1-55685-752-2, pub. date 30 January 2004, audio cassette
- 2004, USA, Neeland Media LLC. (Kindle edition), pub. date 1 April 2004, e-book & paperback
- 2004, USA, 1st World Library ISBN 1-4192-5411-1, ISBN 978-1-4192-5411-6, paperback
- 2004, USA, Wildside Press ISBN 0-8095-6733-4, ISBN 978-0-8095-6733-1, paperback
- 2005, USA, Kessinger Publishing ISBN 0-7661-9477-9, pub. date 30 April 2005, paperback
- 2006, USA, Adamant Media Corp. (Elibron Classic ser.) ISBN 0-543-89660-9, paperback
- 2006, USA, Adamant Media Corp. (Elibron Classic ser.) ISBN 0-543-89659-5, hardback
- 2007, USA, BiblioBazaar (large print edition) ISBN 978-1-4346-4730-6, paperback
- 2007, UK/USA, Penguin Books ISBN 978-0-14-144139-9, pub. date 18 December 2007, paperback
- 2008, USA, NuVision Publications, LLC. ISBN 1-59547-698-9, paperback

== Comic book version ==
In October 1946 The Gilberton Company of New York published their Classics Illustrated comic book version of The Black Arrow as "No. 31."

In 1964, Editorial Sea/Novaro (Mexico) published a comic adaptation in Tesoro De Cuentes Clasicos #89, "La Flecha Negra".

== Original manuscript and textual history ==
Half of Robert Louis Stevenson's original manuscripts are lost, including those of Treasure Island, The Black Arrow and The Master of Ballantrae. During World War I (1914–1918) his heirs sold his papers; many of them were sold at auction in 1918. The text as it appeared in print for the first time in 1883 as a serial in Young Folks: A Boys' and Girls' Paper of Instructive and Entertaining Literature, volumes 22–23, June–October, 1883 has been made available through the University of South Carolina. Stevenson modified his 1883 text in 1888 for publication as a book.
