= The Constable of the Tower =

1861 novel

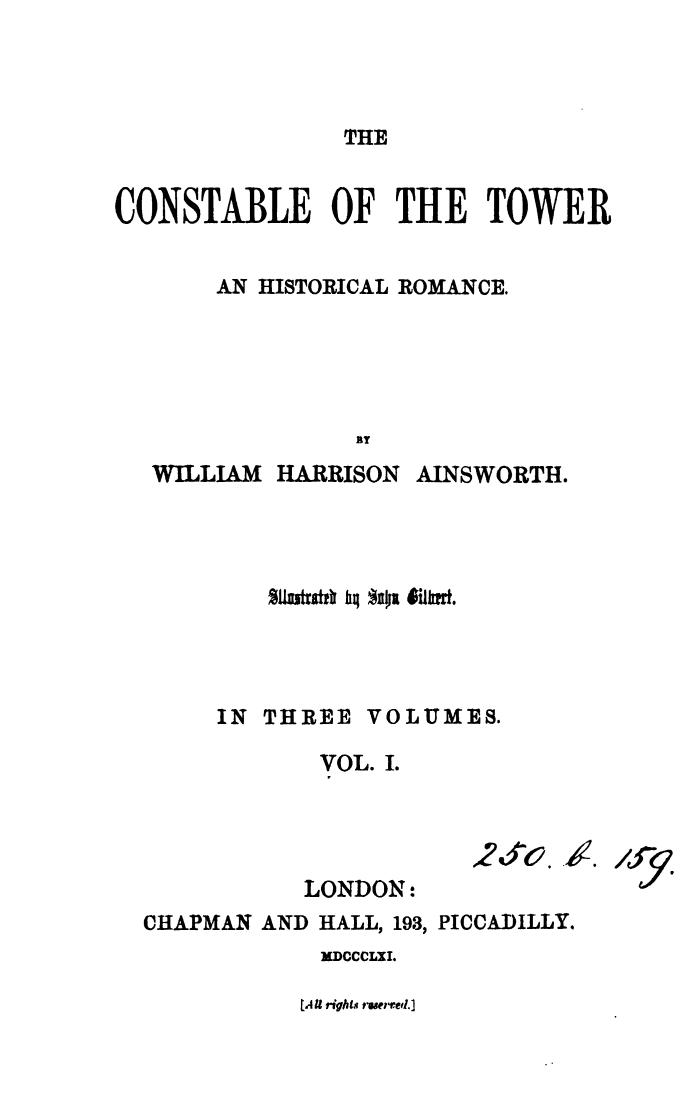
- Author: William Harrison Ainsworth
- Language: English
- Genre: Historical
- Publisher: Chapman and Hall
- Publication date: 1861
- Publication place: United Kingdom
- Media type: Print

The Constable of the Tower is an 1861 historical novel by the British writer William Harrison Ainsworth. Originally serialised in Bentley's Miscellany it was then published in three volumes. It is set in Tudor England following the death of Henry VIII and focuses in particular in the rule of the Lord Protector Duke of Somerset and his subsequent downfall, imprisonment in the Tower of London and execution in 1552. The illustrations were provided by John Gilbert. The sales of the novel were considered disappointing by his publishers Chapman and Hall.

== Bibliography ==
- Carver, Stephen James. The Life and Works of the Lancashire Novelist William Harrison Ainsworth, 1850-1882. Edwin Mellen Press, 2003.
- Mitchell, Rosemary. Picturing the Past: English History in Text and Image, 1830-1870. OUP Oxford, 2000.
- Morrison, Kevin A. Encyclopedia of London's East End. McFarland, 2023.
